= Screaming =

Loud vocalization

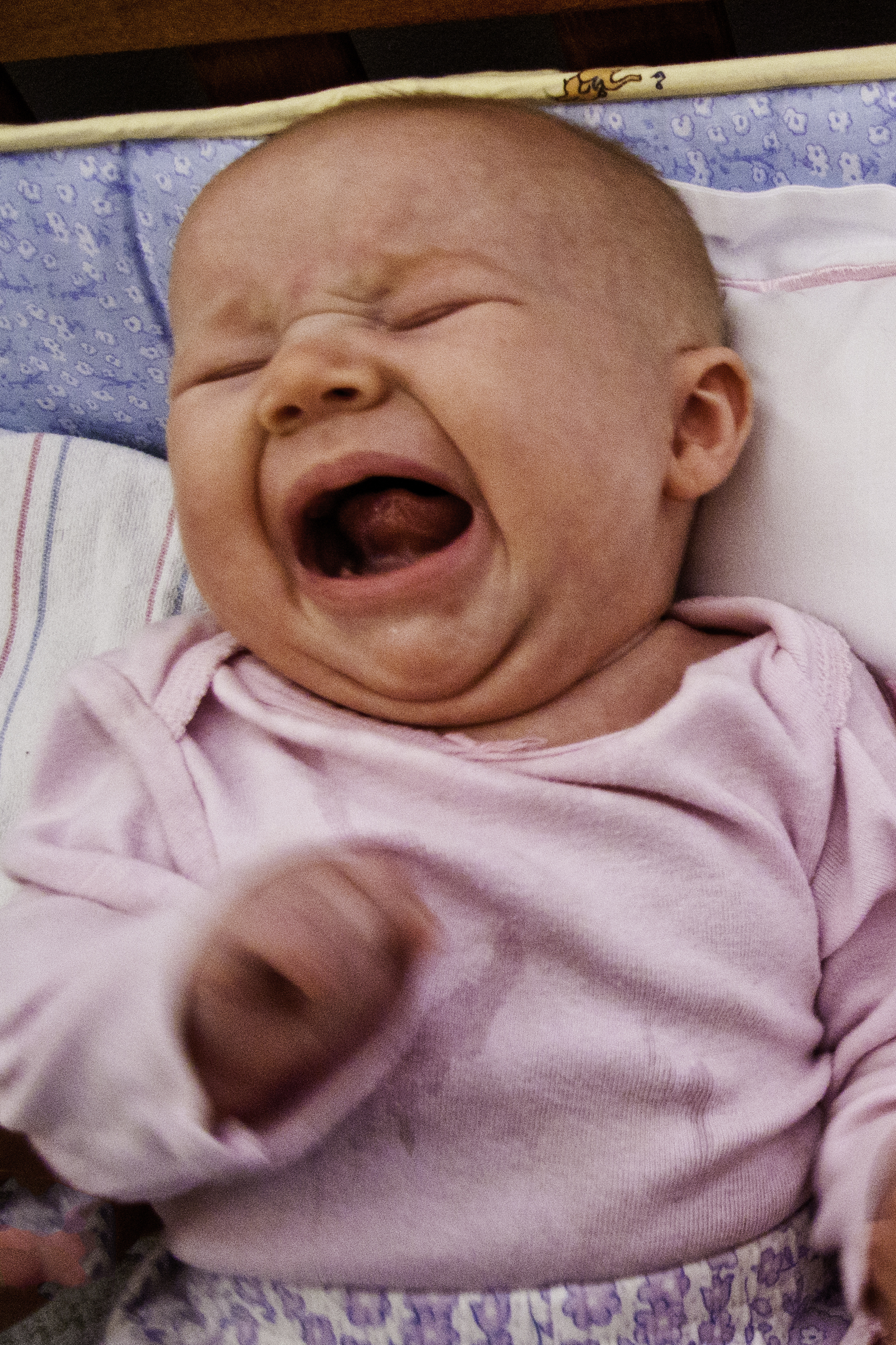
A screaming infant.

UncleSigmund - ahhh
An example of screaming

A scream (/skriːm/) is a loud/hard vocalization in which air is passed through the vocal cords with greater force than in regular or close-distance vocalisation. This can be performed by any creature possessing lungs, including humans.

A scream is often an instinctive or reflex action, with a strong emotional aspect, like fear, pain, annoyance, surprise, joy, excitement, anger, etc.

== Troponyms ==
A large number of words exist to describe the act of making loud vocalizations, whether intentionally or in response to stimuli, and with specific nuances. For example, an early twentieth century synonym guide places variations under the heading of "call", and includes synonyms such as: bawl, bellow, clamor, cry (out), ejaculate, exclaim, roar, scream, shout, shriek, vociferate, and yell, each with its own implications. This source states:

To call is to send out the voice in order to attract another's attention, either by word or by inarticulate utterance. Animals call their mates, or their young; a man calls his dog, his horse, etc. The sense is extended to include summons by bell, or any signal. To shout is to call or exclaim with the fullest volume of sustained voice; to scream is to utter a shriller cry; to shriek or to yell refers to that which is louder and wilder still. We shout words; in screaming, shrieking, or yelling there is often no attempt at articulation. To bawl is to utter senseless, noisy cries, as of a child in pain or anger. Bellow and roar are applied to the utterances of animals, and only contemptuously to those of persons. To clamor is to utter with noisy iteration; it applies also to the confused cries of a multitude. To vociferate is commonly applied to loud and excited speech where there is little besides the exertion of voice. In exclaiming, the utterance may not be strikingly, though somewhat, above the ordinary tone and pitch; we may exclaim by mere interjections, or by connected words, but always by some articulate utterance. To ejaculate is to throw out brief, disconnected, but coherent utterances of joy, regret, and especially of appeal, petition, prayer; the use of such devotional utterances has received the special name of "ejaculatory prayer." To cry out is to give forth a louder and more excited utterance than in exclaiming or calling; one often exclaims with sudden joy as well as sorrow; if he cries out, it is oftener in grief or agony. In the most common colloquial usage, to cry is to express grief or pain by weeping or sobbing. One may exclaim, cry out, or ejaculate with no thought of others' presence; when he calls, it is to attract another's attention.

Another source proposes different implications for some of these terms, stating that "the call is normally addressed to a specific person... and the shout projected to a distant but identifiable target, the holler is emitted to whomever may be within earshot". Whooping is another name given to the same kind of noise making as hollering. This source separately notes that a shout "may be angry or joyous; it may be directed to one person or many; and, sometimes, its purpose may be merely for the satisfaction of release or of hearing an echo".

== As a phenomenon ==
=== In psychology ===
In psychology, the scream is an important theme in the theories of Arthur Janov. In his book The Primal Scream, Janov claims that the cure for neurosis is to confront the patient with their suppressed pain resulting from an experienced trauma. This confrontation gives birth to a scream. Janov believes that it is not necessary that it heals the patient from their trauma. The scream is only a form of expression of primal pain, which comes from one's childhood, and the reliving of this pain and its expression. This finally appears through the scream and can cure the patient from their neurosis.

Janov describes the primal scream as very distinctive and unmistakable. It is a "strangely low, rattling and involuntary sound. [...] Some people are moaning, groaning and are coiling themselves up. [...] One screams as result of all the other times when it had to stay still, was making fun of, was humiliated or was beaten up". Janov also says that the primal scream has series of reactions; "the patients that could not even say 'piep' at home, suddenly feels powerful. The scream seems to be a liberating experience". Janov noticed this with all his patients. Women who seem to have baby-voices during the therapy are developing with their primal scream a very low voice.

=== As focus of power ===
Gregory Whitehead, founder of the Institute for Screamscape Studies, believes that the voice is used to focus the power: "scream used to be a psychological weapon both for you and against your opponent, it raises confidence to the person using it. Creating power with yell is having to affect someone without touching them". In this case screaming is a protective weapon, as also often used by animals, who scream as an expression of power or during fights with another animal.

=== Screaming in pleasure ===
Screaming and yelling are also a means of expressing pleasure. Studies on monkeys have shown that when female monkeys scream during sex, it helps the male ejaculate. An approximation of 86 percent of the times where female monkeys screamed during a sexual encounter, brought a 59 percent success rate, in comparison to the 2 percent, without the female-scream.

Gayle Brewer of the University of Central Lancashire and Colin Hendrie of the University of Leeds conducted similar research with women, showing that women also scream during intercourse as an encouragement for their partner to "hurry up".

=== Screaming as a nascent language ===
Janov believes that for babies, screaming is the only form of communication they can have; it is the only way a baby can express their necessities, that they need food, they are in pain or they simply need or really need some love. Janov writes, "screaming is a language – a primitive one, but a human language".

=== Communication and language ===
Diana König, journalist and broadcasting author, writes: "If the scream of babies is their first communication method, then the scream of adults is a recession from communication. By screaming, in the opposite of calling, the voice becomes overloaded and over-amplified, and it loses its control, its fundamental sound". The scream is there before language and it appears where the language reaches its limits.

Elaine Scarry, writer and literature professor, talks about language in connection to pain and she thinks that pain almost destroys the language because it brings people back into a state where sounds and screams are dominating as they were their means of communication before they learned how to speak. Pain cannot actually be communicated, as it is a personal experience and can only be experienced individually. Pain, as any other concept, is actually an individual experience that can only be communicated as an idea and it also is to be interpreted as. Hegel writes: "The biggest relief when having pain is to be able to scream it out [...] through this expression, the pain becomes objective and this makes the connection between the subject, who is alone in pain, and the object, that is not in pain."

Arnal and colleague demonstrated that human screams exploit a unique acoustic property, roughness, that selectively activates the auditory brain as well as the amygdala, a deep brain structure involved in danger processing.

== Art ==
=== Painting ===
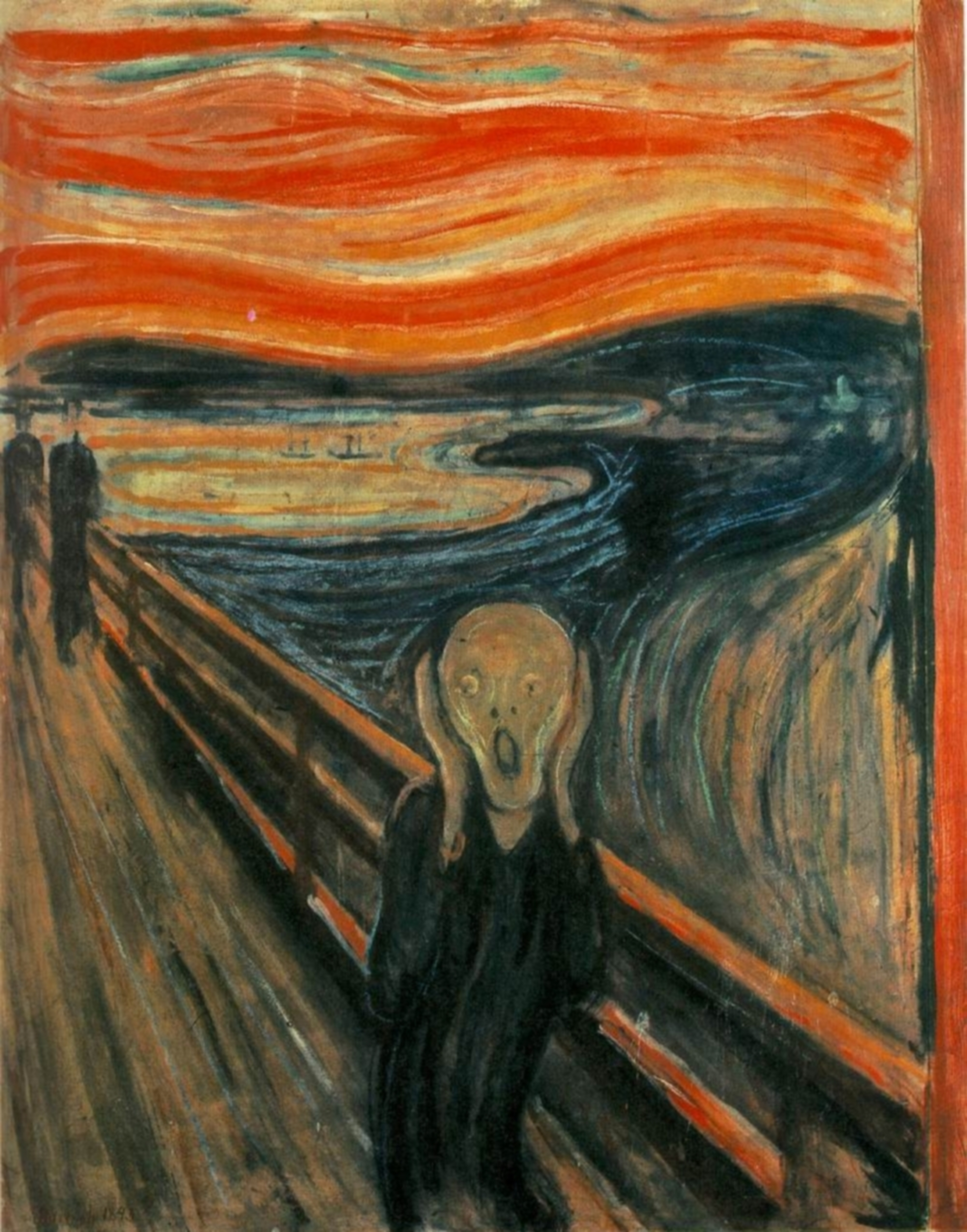
The Scream, Edvard Munch

The Scream (Norwegian: Skrik) is the popular name given to each of many versions of a composition, created as paintings, pastels, and lithographs by the Expressionist artist Edvard Munch between 1893 and 1910. Der Schrei der Natur (The Scream of Nature) is the title Munch gave to these works, all of which show a figure with an agonized expression against a landscape with a tumultuous orange sky. Arthur Lubow has described The Scream as "an icon of modern art, a Mona Lisa for our time."

=== Music ===
In music there are long traditions of scream in rock, punk rock, heavy metal, soul music, rock and roll, and emo music. Vocalists are developing various techniques of screaming that results in different ways of screaming. In rock and metal, music singers are developing very demanding guttural and growled sounds.

Scream is also used predominant as an aesthetic element in "cante jondo", a vocal style in flamenco. The name of this style is translated as "deep sing". The origins of flamenco and also of its name are still not clear. Flamenco is related to the gypsies' music and it is said to have appeared in Andalusia in Spain. In cante jondo, that is a subdivision of flamenco, which is considered to be more serious and deep, the singer is reduced to the most rudimentary method of expression, which is the cry and the scream. Ricardo Molima, a Spanish poet, wrote "flamenco is the primal scream in its primitive form, from a people sunk in poverty and ignorance. Thus, the original flamenco song could be described as a type of self-therapy."

David N. Green, musician, writer and composer, wrote in 1987 an essay about musicians using screams as a singing technique in music. He makes the distinction between harmonic scream that relates to the harmony of the music and has components of tonality, the true scream that is atonal, the lyrical scream that is related with the song's lyrics and the pure scream that is not. The harmonic scream is the scream that is still very clear and has a defined pitch and that, according to Green, can actually be related to a fake scream; as it has no great disturbance, the lyrical scream that is related to words, most of the time swearing and the pure scream or the true scream, that in this case can also be called as the real scream or the primal scream.

Scream in music can also be seen in other ways than just a vocal action. Many musicians use scream as an inspirational source for their playing with instruments. This is usually represented in a loud hit on the instrument's chords, in the case of the instruments that have chords, or a loud striking note, on the blowing instruments.

=== Sound art ===
Pressure of the unspeakable is a radio feature work by Gregory Whitehead. Initiated in 1991 the project started with the founding of the Institute of the Screamscape studies where people were asked through radio and television to call on a hot line and scream. Whitehead notes: "In addition to framing the nervous system, the telephone-microphone-tape-recorder-radio circuitry also provided the key for the acoustic demarcation of pressure in the system: distortion, the disruption of digital codes, pure unmanageable noise. The scream as an eruption in excess of prescribed circuitries, as capable of 'blowing' communications technologies not designed for such extreme and unspeakable meanings".

Whitehead gathered slowly an archive of screams that was edited and resulted in a theoretical narrative radio feature. Allen S. Weiss notes about his work that "the screamscape lies beyond any possible determination of authenticity". The people's vociferations are just manifestations that through their anonymity create a sense of togetherness.

=== Cinema ===
Screaming is a trope in disaster films and horror films, especially in the latter where notable actresses are popularly known as scream queens.

=== Theater ===
Actors are taught from the beginning of their careers how to scream correctly. They learn how to awaken that uncomfortable feeling in the listener without necessarily having to have any psychological attachment.

=== Antonin Artaud ===
Antonin Artaud's last written work To have done with the judgment of god was recorded by him for the French radio in 1947. One day before it was scheduled, the director of the radio prohibited it for strong anti-religious and anti-American reasons. The piece consists of intensive texts with interludes of instrumental and vocal improvised sounds and screams. Allen S. Weiss writes about Antonin Artaud's scream: "the scream is the expulsion of an unbearable, impossible internal polarization between life's forces and death's negation, simultaneously signifying and simulation creation and destruction [...] scream, as a nonmaterial double of excrement, may be both expression and expulsion, a sign of birth creation and frustration [...] the scream is the desublimation of speech into the body, in opposition to the sublimation of body into meaningful speech".

The extreme character of the scream has a life danger element that stands for denying of death. In Artaud's case, a person who was always very close to death and has been calling himself so ever since having strong shock therapies, the scream represents exactly this border between life and death, creation and destruction, of art work and of oneself.

Artaud's screams are mostly related to words. The small interludes that are in between the texts parts sometimes contain screams.

=== Performance art ===
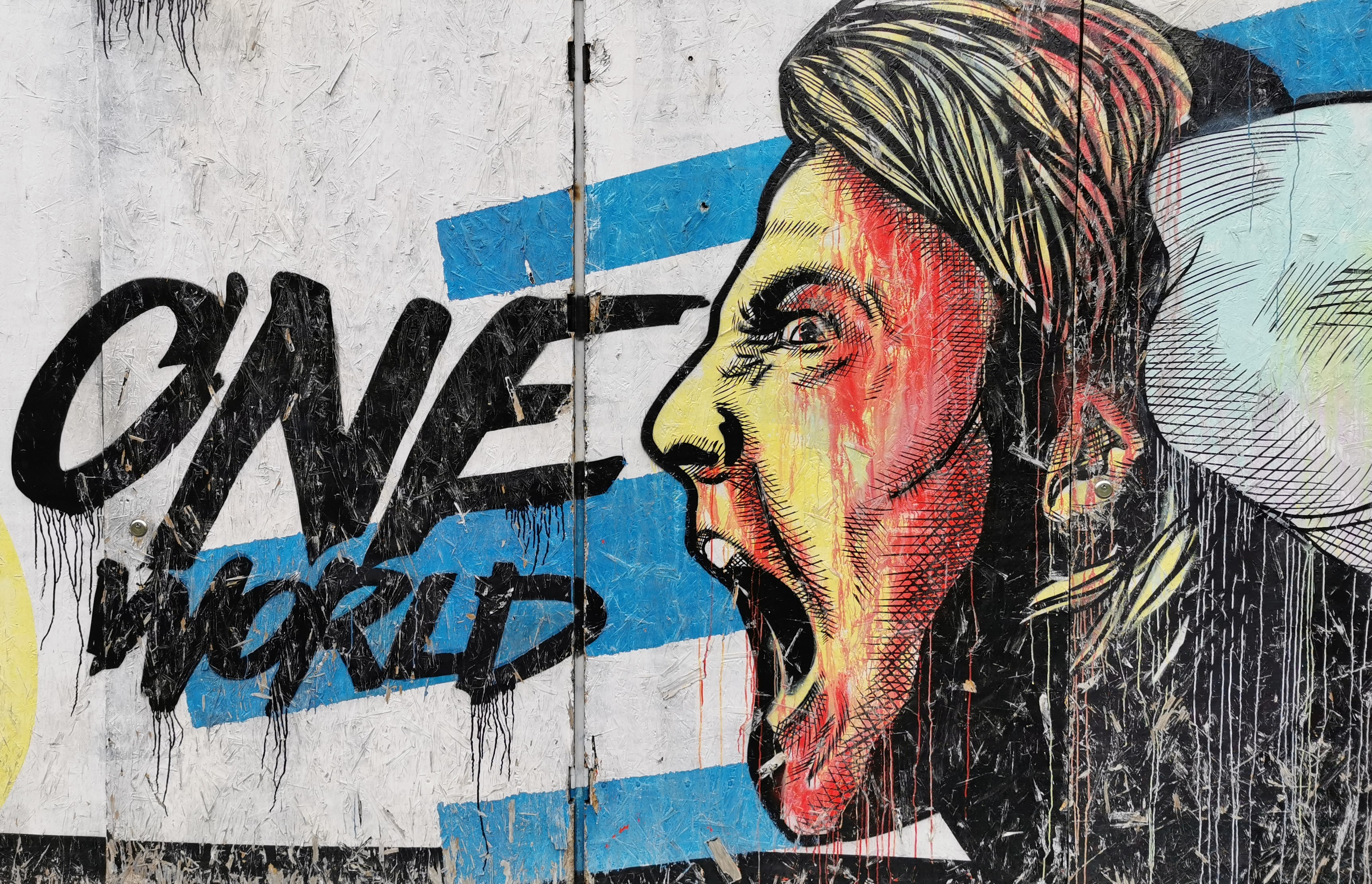
Screaming for good

Marina Abramović used scream as an element in different performances: together with Ulay in AAA AAA, the two are facing each other and are gradually screaming louder and louder while getting closer and closer to each other's face, until they both lose their voice; Freeing the voice, where Abramovic is staying with her head upside down and screaming till she is left with no voice anymore.

== Other aspects ==
=== Dialogue ===
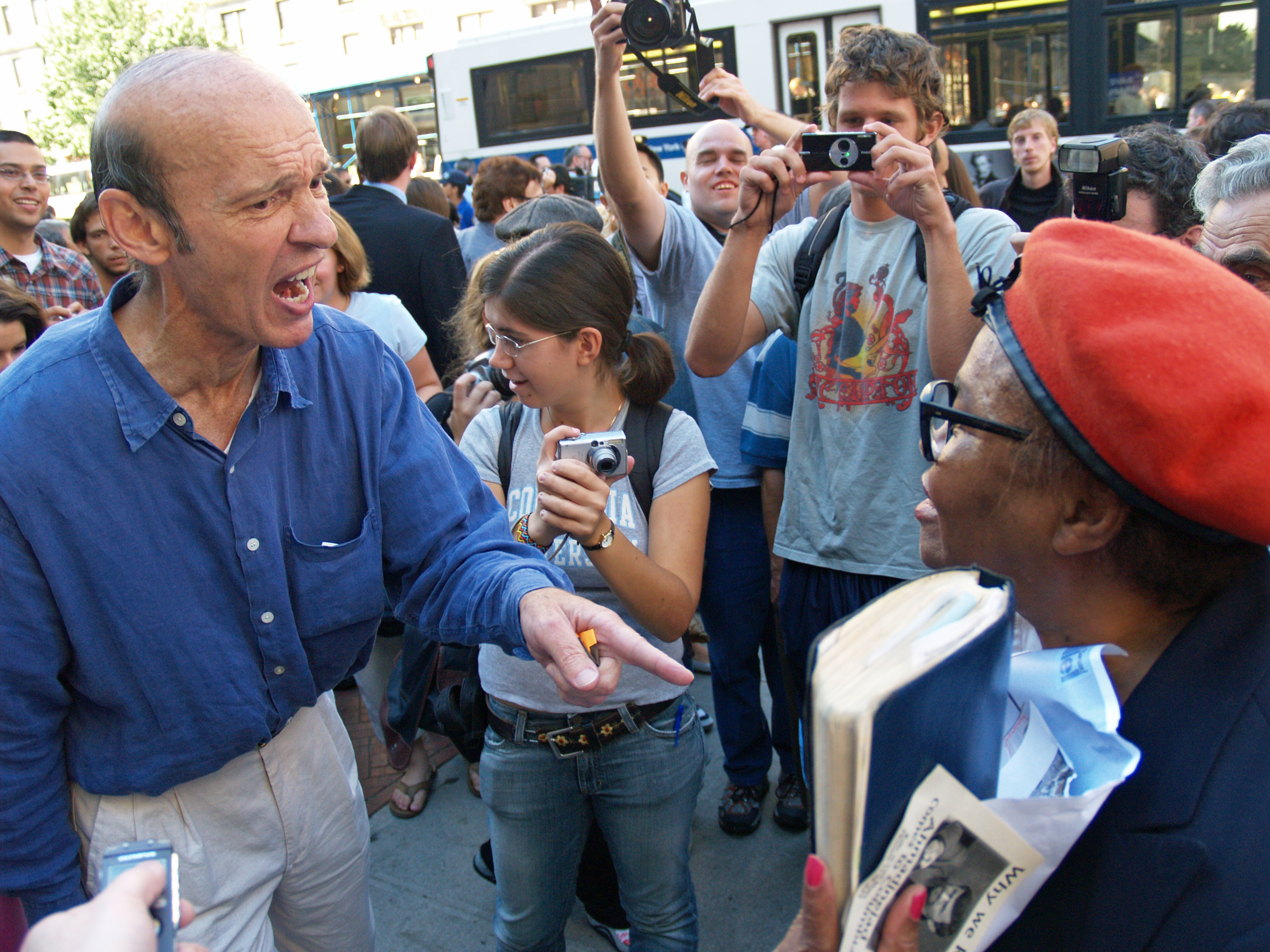
A verbal altercation between two people during a protest in New York City.

Some people, when arguing begin to raise their voices to the point that they are screaming at each other in anger while continuing their debate exchange. Terminology includes "shouting match".

=== Nature ===
In nature screaming is often used as a method for showing dominance. Chimpanzees in particular are known to use this as a method for revealing power, and to show they are superior when fighting.

=== Martial arts ===
Shouting or screaming is commonly employed in martial arts as a means of intimidating an opponent, focusing energy during attacks, or to control breathing. See Kiai.

=== Military ===
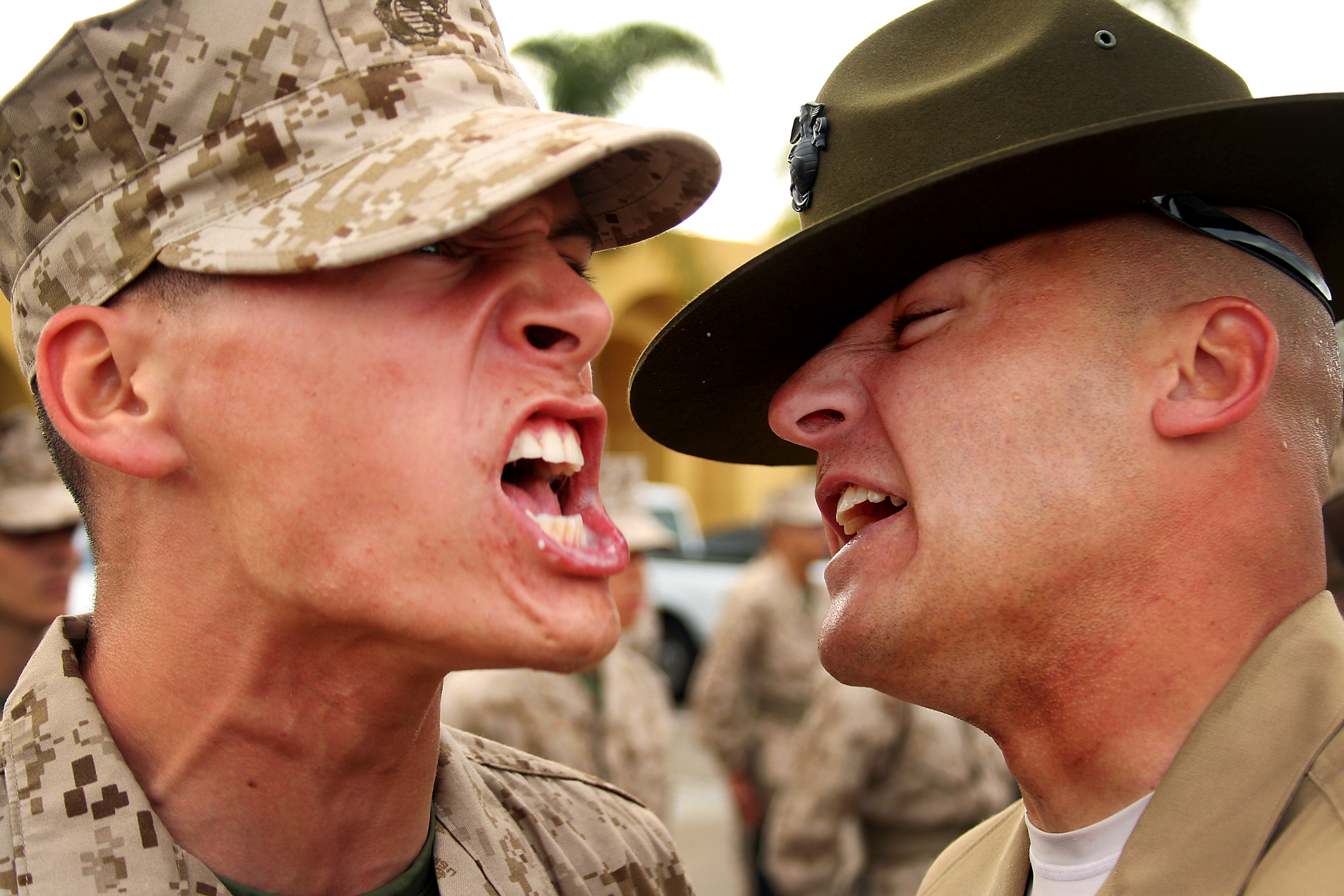
U.S. Marine Corps recruit sounds off in response to a drill instructor.

Drill instructors frequently shout to train recruits into the military culture whilst fostering obedience and expedience. Shouting in this context is intended as stress stimulus, triggering the fight-or-flight response. This allows the drill instructor to observe inherent recruit responses to stress, to modify such responses, and to also acclimate the recruit to stressful situations they will experience in combat. Encouraging screaming by recruits also heightens their aggressiveness and trains them to intimidate opponents.

=== Audio level ===
The volume levels of outcries may be very high, and this has become an issue in the sport of tennis, particularly with regards to Maria Sharapova's loud tennis grunts which have been measured as high as 101.2 decibels. The loudest verified scream emitted by a human measured 129 dBA, a record set by teaching assistant Jill Drake in 2000.

== Unicode ==
Character information
Preview	😱	
Unicode name	FACE SCREAMING IN FEAR	
Encodings	decimal	hex
Unicode	128561	U+1F631
UTF-8	240 159 152 177	F0 9F 98 B1
UTF-16	55357 56881	D83D DE31
Numeric character reference	&#128561;	&#x1F631;

== See also ==
- Battle cry
- Death growl
- Heavy metal singing
- Howie scream, another often used stock scream
- Rebel yell
- Tarzan yell
- Wilhelm scream, an iconic sound effect used in films dating back to 1951
