= Castle thunder (sound effect) =

Recording of thunder used as a sound effect

Castle thunder - alternate versions
An older variation of the sound effect, followed by the more recent version

Castle thunder is a sound effect that consists of the sound of a loud thunderclap during a rainstorm. It was originally recorded for the 1931 film Frankenstein, and has since been used in dozens of films, television programs, and commercials.

== History ==
After its use in Frankenstein, the Castle Thunder was used in dozens of films from the 1930s through the 1980s, including Citizen Kane (1941), Bambi (1942), You Only Live Twice (1967), Young Frankenstein (1974), Star Wars (1977), Ghostbusters (1984), Back to the Future (1985), and Big Trouble in Little China (1986). Use of the effect in subsequent years has declined because the quality of the original analog recording does not sufficiently hold up in modern sound mixes.

The effect appears in Disney productions (largely from the 1940s to 1980s), and Hanna-Barbera cartoons, including the original Scooby-Doo animated series. It can also be heard at the Haunted Mansion attraction at Disney theme parks.

The sound can be found on a few sound effects libraries distributed by Sound Ideas (such as the Soundelux Master Collection, the Network Sound Effects Library, the 20th Century Fox Sound Effects Library and the Hanna-Barbera SoundFX Library).

== See also ==
- Wilhelm scream
- Howie scream
- Tarzan's jungle call
- Goofy holler
