= Jean Jenson =

Jean C. Jenson is an American psychotherapist, social worker and author. Jenson studied primal therapy with Arthur Janov in the seventies, and then started her own practice in Hailey, Idaho.

== Book & career ==
In 1996, Jenson published the book Reclaiming your life: A Step-by-Step Guide to Using Regression Therapy to Overcome the Effects of Childhood Abuse. In the book Jenson describes an approach to working with relationship problems and other psychological issues. Her approach involves combining behavioral changes and emotional work. Alice Miller, who wrote the introduction to that volume, later sought unsuccessfully to have her introduction removed, having come to believe that primal therapy can be dangerous as a self-help method.

After her book was published, Jenson was invited to teach psychotherapy in the Netherlands, and together with the Dutch therapist Ingeborg Bosch, Jenson developed the thoughts in her book into the new therapy method PastRealityIntegration (PRI).

== Personal life ==
Jenson is retired and shares her time between Hailey and San Francisco.
