= Center for Feeling Therapy =

The Center for Feeling Therapy was a radical psychotherapy community that existed in Los Angeles between 1971 and 1980. At its peak, it had 350 resident patients and 2,000 members including several branches in other locations. Although lacking the typical religious component, the group has been described as a cult by various sources, including ex-members, researchers, and a judge. The Center was led by Richard "Riggs" Corriere and Joseph Hart, who would ultimately be stripped of their licenses to practice psychology as a result of the fallout from the group's collapse. The rise and fall of the Center has been called the greatest scandal in the history of psychology and led to the biggest psychology-related lawsuit of its time.

The Center was founded by former members of Arthur Janov's Primal Institute who were dissatisfied with what they believed were shortcomings in primal therapy. The Center started as a direct offshoot of primal therapy, but quickly abandoned primal therapy and subsequently went through many theoretical shifts, including an emphasis on dream analysis.

Over time, the Center became cult-like and extremely abusive to its members. The abuse consisted of physical assault, sexual humiliation, verbal assault, financial abuse, excessive demands for ritual, inadequate rest, and enforced physical labor. The physical labor was so severe that some members were permanently injured by it. Patients at the Center were isolated from the outside world and were expected to socialize and work only with other Center patients.

After nine years, the members rebelled against the center, leading to its closure in 1980. Some of the former members later sued the founding therapists in what was the largest psychology malpractice suit in California. They were represented by Paul Morantz, who specialized in suing cults. The Los Angeles Times reported that the suit settled in 1986 for around $6,000,000.

== Founding ==
The Center for Feeling Therapy was founded in 1971 by Joe Hart and Richard ("Riggs") Corriere, who had been in the training program at Janov's Primal Institute, along with seven other people, two of whom had been certified as primal therapists. Werner Karle was one of the founding members and had contributed to a scientific study reprinted in Janov's second book.

Joe Hart and Riggs Corriere confronted Arthur Janov one day over their dissatisfaction with his theory. Whereas Janov claimed that unresolved childhood trauma was at the root of all neurosis, Joe and Riggs felt that patients needed to move beyond past pain to change their present lives. Janov denied that, claiming that any attempt to improve his technique was like interns correcting a senior surgeon's technique. Janov also claimed that Joe and Riggs were really interested only in power and were about to be fired anyway.

After their fateful confrontation with Janov that day, Joe and Riggs separated from Janov's institute and founded the Center for Feeling Therapy. Seven other therapists joined them, including two primal therapists from Janov's institute (Steve Gold and Jerry Binder).

According to Mither's description of the founding therapists' initial mindset,

"All decisions would be made collectively; that way, no one person's theories or ego would dominate. Even more important, all therapists would continue to get treatment from their peers. That way, the therapy would grow as they did."

Going Sane, the book published a few years later describing their "Feeling Therapy", was given very favorable reviews by some, notably:

"A group of very honest young therapists tell, with great candor and openness, about the new kind of therapy they are developing and the mutuality of relationship it involves." - Carl Rogers

== Development of ideas ==
Over time, the Center for Feeling Therapy went through numerous drastic changes in its basic ideas. The Center started with primal therapy as its main therapeutic approach, but soon abandoned primal therapy in favor of an emphasis on "present-life" feelings, then abandoned that in favor of other ideas. These drastic shifts in theoretical approach were common throughout the life of the Center.

After abandoning primal therapy, the therapists developed a dream hypothesis which formed the basis of their second book, The Dream Makers. According to the dream hypothesis, one of the major goals of therapy was to have lucid, clear dreams which were devoid of fictitious elements and which could guide a person through their life. It was claimed that the senior therapists all had such dreams and that the patients could learn to have them too. To that end, the patients were given exercises to improve their dreams; they were also given charts, graphs, workbooks, and so on to track the progress of their dreams.

Thereafter, the therapists abandoned the dream hypothesis and replaced it with another concept, called "Psychological Fitness." The concept of Psychological Fitness was claimed to help patients succeed in life and make a lot of money. The patients were encouraged to wear very expensive clothing, to appear professional, to start business ventures, and to work very long hours. The patients were told that they would "teach the world to excel."

== Organization of the Center ==
The Center for Feeling Therapy was organized as a hierarchy of groups, with the highest group ("Group One") having the most successful patients, as determined by the senior therapists, and the lowest group ("Tombstone Group") having the least successful patients. Patients could be promoted to higher groups or demoted to lower ones, based on how thoroughly they had carried out the assignments or commands given to them by their therapists.

The inpatients at the Center lived communally in a cluster of buildings in Hollywood, Los Angeles, California. The therapists lived in separate houses there, and the clients lived in apartment buildings surrounding the Center building. The apartment buildings were largely devoted to center patients. The patients lived in crowded conditions, often with several people living together in the same room.

== Life at the Center ==
Life at the center was rigorous and abusive.

Patients were often belittled, demeaned, insulted, or humiliated. Patients were frequently called names, such as "weak," "crazy," "fat," "loser," and so on. Patients were often subjected to insults from the entire group since the therapists often required the other patients to gather together and collectively insult anyone whom the therapist deemed to be out of favor.

Patients were given frequent therapy assignments by their therapists which they had to complete, or they would risk being abused and demoted to lower groups. The assignments often involved activities which were demeaning or absurd. For example, one woman who was judged to be overweight was assigned to act like a cow and to make "grazing" motions on the carpet.

Patients were often physically assaulted by their therapists. The assault was part of a practice called "sluggo" in which the therapists would break the patients' defenses by hitting them. Patients were often struck repeatedly during therapy sessions, which sometimes led to bruising and bleeding.

Patients had their lives controlled by their therapists in the minutest detail. The patients were told what to wear, what to do, which job to hold, whom to have sex with and how often, whom to date, whom to marry, whether to have children or not, how much they could weigh (for women), and, most importantly, whether or not they could leave. Almost all patients who expressed a desire to leave were informed by their therapists that they were still far too disordered mentally to succeed in the outside world.

For some patients, life at the Center involved very long hours of grueling physical labor for very little pay. The severity of the labor, combined with inadequate rest, led some patients to suffer permanent physical damage.

After the ideals of "Psychological Fitness" came to the fore, patients were not only abused, but often subjected to monetary fines for lack of performance, or for insufficient work.

In a nine-year span, none of the 350 resident members had a single child even though most of the women were young. Women who did get pregnant were told to get abortions. One woman who got pregnant in her 40s was told she "was not ready" to be a parent, and was pressured to get an abortion with the promise that she had time to get pregnant again.

Patients at the Center were isolated from the outside world and were expected to socialize and work only with other Center patients.

== Rebellion and closure ==
After nine years, the patients rebelled and the center in Los Angeles (along with its satellites in Boston, Honolulu, Munich, and San Francisco) was shut down in November 1980. The therapists were subsequently (1986–1987) banned from practicing in California as a result of lawsuits initiated about five years earlier by the patients against the therapists, accusing them of rape and other forms of mistreatment. The victims and some observers of the case were shocked and dismayed that criminal charges were not brought against the therapists, and the victims never received the apology they had hoped for from the founders. A lawsuit involving as many as 55 former patients that charged the Center with fraud, brainwashing, and physical and emotional abuse was settled on favorable terms in January 1986.

== Later research ==
The Center for Feeling Therapy was discussed in Therapy Gone Mad by Carol Lynn Mithers, a book based on interviews of 48 former patients of The Center for Feeling Therapy who shared diaries, notes and audiotapes with her. Another book on the subject is Insane Therapy, Portrait of a Psychotherapy Cult by Marybeth Ayella. A third book discussing it is Escape: My Life Long War Against Cults by Paul Morantz.
