= Frieman =

Frieman is a surname. Notable people with the surname include:

- Catherine Frieman (born 1982), American archaeologist and professor
- Edward A. Frieman (1926–2013), American physicist
- Jonathan Frieman, American political activist
- Joshua A. Frieman, theoretical astrophysicist

== See also ==
- Freeman (surname)
