= Molko v. Holy Spirit Association for the Unification of World Christianity =

Legal case heard before the California Supreme Court

Molko v. Holy Spirit Association
- Court: California Supreme Court
- Full case name: Molko v. Holy Spirit Association for the Unification of World Christianity
- Decided: 1988
- Citations: 46 Cal.3d 1092, 762 P.2d 46, 252 Cal.Rptr. 122
- Transcript: Molko v. Holy Spirit Assn.

Court membership
- Judge sitting: Justice Stanley Mosk (opinion)

Molko v. Holy Spirit Association for the Unification of World Christianity was a legal case heard before the California Supreme Court, which issued its ruling in 1988.

== Plaintiffs ==
David Molko and Tracy Leal, two former members of the Unification Church of the United States, were represented by Ford Greene before the California Supreme Court. The plaintiffs connected coercive persuasion to the legal concept of undue influence. Molko's and Leal's case had been dismissed by San Francisco Superior Court judge Stuart Pollack and by a three judge appeals court before they appealed to the California Supreme Court.

== Expert testimony ==
A psychologist and a psychiatrist testified that the church's persuasion techniques rendered former members legally incapable of exercising their independent judgement, essentially brainwashing them.

== Court ruling ==
In 1988, the state high court held that religious organizations may be sued for fraud and intentional infliction of emotional distress when they use deception to cause candidates for recruitment to unwittingly expose themselves to brainwashing techniques. It also held that the members of the Unification Church who recruited Molko had lied by denying any religious connection to their recruitment pitch and, when they gained his trust, brainwashed him. In a legal opinion written by Justice Stanley Mosk regarding tactics religious groups use to attract followers, the court found that any burden on the free exercise of religion was outweighed by the state's interest in protecting against "fraudulent induction of unconsenting individuals into an atmosphere of coercive persuasion" because many people exposed to brainwashing techniques without their knowledge or consent would develop serious and sometimes irreversible physical and psychiatric disorders up to and including schizophrenia, self-mutilation, and suicide. The court also found that the plaintiffs, when church members, "were incapable of exercising their own will."

In facts part of the ruling the court mentioned that both Molko and Leal, were forcibly abducted by deprogrammers hired by their parents from a public space while they were fundraising money for the Unification Church by selling flowers.

== Amicus brief ==
An amicus curiae brief was filed in favor of the plaintiffs by attorney Paul Morantz, who specialized in representing persons who claimed they were subject to brainwashing. Morantz served as pro bono appellate counsel and also participated in oral arguments.

An amicus curiae brief of the American Psychological Association (APA) stated that the coercive persuasion theory that the plaintiffs advanced is not a meaningful scientific concept. In a petition to the court the petitioners stated, that in the context of the case, the "coercive persuasion" hypothesis is wholly divorced from its purported theoretical basis, the theory of coercive persuasion is not scientific, the methodological foundations for the theory of coercive persuasion does not exist and that the allegation of "coercive persuasion" on which the California Supreme Court relied has no specific legitimacy, but uses the language of science to cloak an attack on religious liberty.

The APA's brief was later criticized by sociologist Benjamin Zablocki, who pointed out that the theory of coercive persuasion, which he called brainwashing, had neither been proved nor disproved by scientific consensus.

== Other issues and opinions ==
The court ruled that false imprisonment can exist even if the victim is not placed under arrest. It also found that the Free Exercise Clause of the United States Constitution does not bar an action for fraud against a religious organization when that action implicates action, not belief.

Law professor R. Kent Greenawalt argues against the court's ruling saying that religious individuals often subject themselves to conditions that may be psychologically harmful, that the defendants did know the identity of the group they were joining, and that courts would rule differently if a more established religion (he uses the Roman Catholic Church as an example) were involved.

== Outcome ==
The defendants appealed to the United States Supreme Court which refused to review the decision of the California Supreme Court, and the case was settled out of court.
