= Primal Scream (disambiguation) =

Primal Scream are a Scottish rock band formed in 1982.

Primal Scream may also refer to:

- Primal Scream (Harvard), a student tradition
- The Primal Scream (1970), a psychology book by Dr. Arthur Janov about primal therapy
- Primal Scream (Maynard Ferguson album) (1976)
- Primal Scream (Primal Scream album) (1989)
- "Primal Scream" (song) (1991), by Mötley Crüe
- "Primal Scream", an episode of the television series Birds of Prey (2002)

== See also ==
- Primal therapy
