= Stock sound effect =

Prerecorded sound effect intended for reuse

Audio sample of the Wilhelm Scream, a widely used stock sound effect

A stock sound effect is a prerecorded sound effect intended to be reused with an entertainment product, as opposed to creating a new and unique sound effect. It is intended to work within a sound effect library.

== History ==
As far back as Ancient Greece, sound effects have been used in entertainment productions. Sound effects (also known as sound FX, SFX, or simply FX) are used to enhance theatre, radio, film, television, video games, and online media.

Sound effects were originally added to productions by creating the sounds needed in real-time. Various devices and props were utilized to approximate the actual sounds, including coconut shells for horse hooves, and a sheet of metal for thunder. With the advent of radio and specifically radio dramas, the role of sound effects became more important. When cinema went from silent to "talkies", sound effects became a large part of this new medium, too.

Audio recording technology continued to evolve, making it easier to record and replay sound. As this happened, the more commonly used and harder-to-replicate sound effects were pre-recorded to make them more accessible. Prerecording also allowed the same sound effect to be used many times.

Both producers' and listeners' sensibilities began evolving with the technology, and the need for more realistic sound effects or for using the "real" sound increased. Therefore, a more urgent need developed for prerecorded sound effects.

Over time, the quality of audio recording and playback increased, as did the demand for a wider variety of highly specific sounds. For example, rather than use a generic gunshot, a producer might request a gunshot from a specific type of gun, shot under precise conditions. Access to "real" sound effects became increasingly important to producers.

These collections of prerecorded sound effects, both real and artificial, began to be referred to as stock sound effects and were organized into libraries. As their usage increased, stock sound effects libraries became the valuable assets of sound design artists and production companies. Some stock sound effects have been reused so many times that they have become easily recognizable and even cliché. Examples of these include the scream of a red-tailed hawk, castle thunder, or the Wilhelm and Howie screams.

Many of the original sound effects libraries originated in the mid to late 1950s from film and television studios that employed the artists who created them, such as Warner Bros. and Hanna-Barbera. Audio Fidelity Records was one of the first record labels to join in releasing compilations from the late 1950s to the early 1970s, notably Elektra alongside Jac Holzman's released Authentic Sound Effects in 1964 as a 13 volume series. Over time, independent companies such as Sound Ideas and Hollywood Edge became involved, both distributing the major studios' libraries as well as making their own available to the public.

The internet ushered in a new generation of technology, entertainment media, and sound effects libraries. Sounddogs became the first to distribute sound effects libraries over the internet and Soundrangers became the first to create an all-new sound effects library for internet-based entertainment. Dozens of other websites now provide stock sounds for movies, video games, and software. Others such as Freesound aim to provide free sound effects under the public domain.

Over the years, with the evolution of sound recording technology and new formats, the format used for sound effects libraries also evolved. Sound libraries are now available on many types of media, including vinyl records, reel-to-reel tape, cassette tapes, compact discs, hard drives, and via the internet. Sound effects libraries now include more complex, layered, and mixed sounds along with a wider variety of incidental real-world sounds.

== Often-used examples ==
Wilhelm scream
A man screaming, first used in the 1951 Western film Distant Drums and used as a running joke by sound designers in many films and television shows.
Howie scream

"The Howie Long Scream"

Also known as the Howie Long scream or Screams 3; Man, Gut-Wrenching Scream and Fall into Distance. This is a frequently used film, television, and video game stock sound effect for a scream. Often compared to the Wilhelm scream, its prominence in a number of movies has launched a few nicknames such as Howie Long Scream, in reference to Howie Long's character's death scene in the 1996 film Broken Arrow. It appears to have originated from a fight scene in the 1980 film The Ninth Configuration.
Tarzan yell
The distinctive, ululating yell of the character Tarzan as portrayed by actor Johnny Weissmuller in the films based on the character created by Edgar Rice Burroughs starting with Tarzan the Ape Man (1932).
Universal telephone ring
A ringing telephone, used in the opening credits of The Rockford Files, designed by Ben Burtt.
Red-tailed hawk calls

Red-tailed hawk call

The piercing scream of the red-tailed hawk is widely used for other birds of prey, especially bald eagles, as well as shots of nature, including deserts and mountains.
Common loon calls

Common loon tremolo call

The wailing call of the loon is widely used in film and television to evoke wilderness and suspense.
Castle thunder
A loud thunderclap during a rainstorm, originally recorded for the 1931 Universal Pictures film Frankenstein.
Diddy laugh
Also known as Two Children Giggling or Two Young Kids Giggle. The sound of two children giggling, originally recorded in 1978. It debuted in the 1990 TriStar Pictures film Air America and it is colloquially named for its use in the 1997 video game Diddy Kong Racing.

== List of sound effects library ==
Application	License	Platform	Soundboard	Voice changer	Recorder	TTS	MIDI	Price	Free/trial edition
Soundpad	Proprietary	Microsoft Windows	Yes	No	No	Yes	No	"$4.99"	Yes, demo
MyInstantplay	Proprietary	Web browser, Android (operating system)	Yes	Yes	No	No	No	Free	Yes
OnlineSoundboard	Proprietary	Web browser, Android (operating system)	Yes	Yes	No	No	No	Free	Yes

== See also ==
- Post-production – Step in film, video, audio or photography process
- Sampling (music) – Reuse of sound recording in another recording
