= Shouting match =

Or rowing, an argument

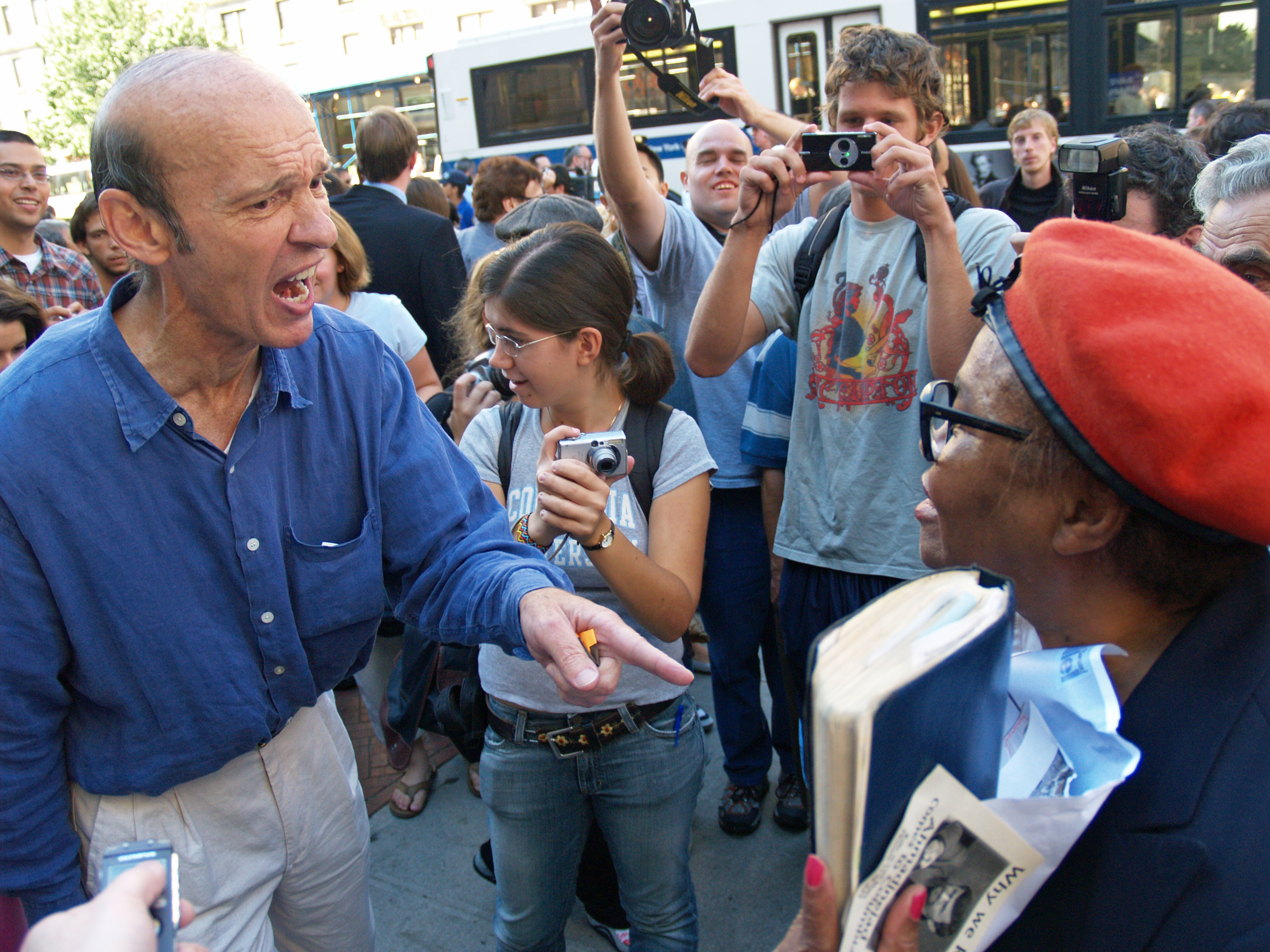
Two people in a shouting match over religion

A shouting match is an argument or debate characterized by the loud volume or intensity of the participants, usually with the same level of authority.

== Parliamentary procedures ==
Large assemblies may easily degenerate into shouting matches as the participants raise their voices just in order to be heard. To control this tendency towards chaos, rules of conduct such as Robert's Rules are often used.

== Productive confrontation ==
Some assemblies may choose this form of discourse deliberately so that creative contributions are not stifled by formal rules. The Bourbaki working parties to establish a definitive new reference work for mathematics were conducted in this way, being described as “Two or three monologues shouted at top voice, seemingly independently of one another” by Armand Borel, who attributed the success of this process to the commitment and hard work of the members. At the General Electric company, the successful chief executive, Jack Welch, forced his managers to justify their positions by intensive argument that often became shouting matches. The result was to make the management confront reality and motivate them to make their proposals work.

== In commerce ==
Shouting matches should be avoided in commercial interactions between customers and suppliers because they tend to poison relations between the parties and so reduce the possibility of a productive deal. Training and role-playing may be used to develop the emotional intelligence required to handle such situations effectively.

In public situations such as a nightclub or bar, staff that get into shouting matches with patrons look badly unprofessional. If they instead ignore the insults, the intoxicated customers will get frustrated and leave.

== Online ==
Online communication in internet forums commonly takes the form of a shouting match, sometimes using all caps to denote shouting. This is due to the anonymity which reduces the possibility of sanction for intemperate speech. So, rather than a listening and rational exchange, the format fosters rage and aggression which results in extreme opinions and insults.

== As social ritual ==
The Yanomamo people of the Orinoco are known as The Fierce People. When two tribes meet for a feast, their chiefs start by engaging in a ritualised shouting match in which they ostensibly engage in fierce conflict but, by their rhythmic interaction, establish a satisfying bond.

== 2025 Trump–Zelenskyy Oval Office meeting ==
A meeting between U.S. President Donald Trump and Ukrainian President Volodymyr Zelenskyy at the White House Oval Office on February 28, 2025, dramatically escalated into a public shouting match in front of the press. The confrontation, described as "unlike any other in the Oval Office in modern times," centered on U.S. policy toward the ongoing Russo-Ukrainian War and resulted in the cancellation of a planned agreement and joint press conference.

== See also ==
- Screaming: Dialogue
