= Tarzan yell =

Signature sound of Tarzan

Weissmuller's famous "Tarzan yell"
audio sequence extracted from one of Weissmuller's Tarzan movies

The Tarzan yell or Tarzan's jungle call is the distinctive, ululating yell of the character Tarzan as portrayed by actor Johnny Weissmuller in the films based on the character created by Edgar Rice Burroughs starting with Tarzan the Ape Man (1932). The yell was a creation of the movies based on what Burroughs described in his books as simply "the victory cry of the bull ape."

== History and origin ==
Although the RKO Picture version of the Tarzan yell was putatively that of Weissmuller, different stories exist as to how the Tarzan yell was created.

One claim is that the yell was developed and recorded by opera singer Lloyd Thomas Leech. Leech performed opera from the 1940s into the '60s, winning the Chicagoland Music Festival on August 17, 1946, and went on to sing throughout the U.S., touring with several opera companies. Leech recalls inventing the Tarzan yell at a promotional event for the film, where a representative of the studio had said that the yell was still to be decided. Leech suggested a form of yodel as "a real wild sound", and says that he went on to record the cry for the first three Tarzan films, with Weissmuller later learning to perform it himself.

According to politician Bill Moyers, the yell was created by combining the recordings of three men: one baritone, one tenor, and one hog caller from Arkansas. Another widely published notion concerns the use of an Austrian yodel played backwards at abnormally fast speed. Biographer John Taliaferro recounts how MGM studios "concocted a story that the sound was actually the invention of engineers, who had blended Weissmuller's own voice with a hyena's howl played backward, a camel's bleat, the pluck of a violin, and a soprano's high C. It was a commentary on the mystique of talkies and the bizarre singularity of the yell itself that the public accepted the studio's fib as fact."

Weissmuller maintained that the yell was actually his own voice. His version is supported by his son and by his Tarzan co-star, Maureen O'Sullivan, and biographer John Taliaferro who writes that "the noise was nothing more than Weissmuller's own yodel, which he had acquired, after a fashion, from the German beer halls and immigrant picnics of his youth".

The yell, as used in the six MGM films, is a palindrome, it sounds the same when played backwards, indicating some manipulation in the sound editing department. The first part of the sound plays normally but when it reaches the half way point, it becomes the same sound but played in reverse.

== Appearances ==
- Comedienne Carol Burnett would perform the yell on request during a weekly question-and-answer session on her comedy sketch series, The Carol Burnett Show. She taught herself as a young girl and once taught it to opera singer Beverly Sills.

== Trademark ==
The sound itself is a registered trademark and service mark, owned by Edgar Rice Burroughs, Inc.

Registration Numbers: 2210506; 3841800; 4462890.
Registration Dates: December 15, 1998; August 31, 2010; January 7, 2014.
Description of Mark: The mark consists of the sound of the famous Tarzan yell. The mark is a yell consisting of a series of approximately ten sounds, alternating between the chest and falsetto registers of the voice, as follow -

1. a semi-long sound in the chest register,
2. a short sound up an interval of one octave plus a fifth from the preceding sound,
3. a short sound down a Major 3rd from the preceding sound,
4. a short sound up a Major 3rd from the preceding sound,
5. a long sound down one octave plus a Major 3rd from the preceding sound,
6. a short sound up one octave from the preceding sound,
7. a short sound up a Major 3rd from the preceding sound,
8. a short sound down a Major 3rd from the preceding sound,
9. a short sound up a Major 3rd from the preceding sound,
10. a long sound down an octave plus a fifth from the preceding sound.

Recognition of the trademark's registration within the European Union is uncertain. In late 2007, the Office for Harmonization in the Internal Market (OHIM) determined that attempts by ERB, Inc. to maintain such trademark must fail legally, reasoning that "[w]hat has been filed as a graphic representation is from the outset not capable of serving as a graphic representation of the applied-for sound ... The examiner was therefore correct to refuse the attribution of a filing date." Regardless, the trademark registration was updated in 2010 (to include slot machines) and 2014 (to include online use).

== Other Tarzan yells ==
The first ever version of the yell can be found in the part-sound serial Tarzan the Tiger (1929). This version is described as a "Nee-Yah!" noise.

In the 1932 Tarzan radio serial with James Pierce, the yell sounds like "Taaar-maan-ganiii". In the great-ape language mentioned in the Tarzan novels, "Mangani" means the great-apes themselves, and "Tarmangani" means "white great-ape" i.e. white humans.

A very similar cry was used for Burroughs' own Tarzan film, The New Adventures of Tarzan (1935), shot concurrently with the MGM Weissmuller movies in Central America with Herman Brix as a cultured Tarzan. The yell can best be described as a "Tarmangani" or "Mangani" sound that gradually rises ever higher in pitch, i.e. "Aaaah-mmanng-gaaaa-neeee".

In the 1930s Weissmuller films, Jane (as portrayed by Maureen O'Sullivan) used her own variation of the Tarzan yell.

Elmo Lincoln, the first actor to play Tarzan albeit in a silent film, recreated his unheard victory cry in a 1952 episode of You Asked for It.

Tarzan's yell is used as a melodic refrain in the Baltimora single "Tarzan Boy". This refrain plays in place of an ordinary Tarzan yell when Haru climbs and struggles to keep his balance on the top of a palm tree in Beverly Hills Ninja.

The refrain was also used in a 1993 jungle-themed advertisement for Listerine's Cool Mint mouthwash.

In the 1991 television series Land of the Lost, Christa (played by Shannon Day) used a similar sounding version of the yell that was used to calm certain animals.

In the 1976-1979 Filmation animated series Tarzan, Lord of the Jungle, the Tarzan Yell was performed by Danton Burroughs (1944-2008), grandson of Edgar Rice Burroughs "...Outside of Johnny Weissmuller, Danton had one of the most exciting and authentic Tarzan victory cries -- he was even commissioned to do the yell for the Filmation Television animated Tarzan series and has startled many passers-by at ERB conventions in the past." Edgar Rice Burroughs's original novel, Tarzan of the Apes, was first published in book form by A. C. McClurg & Co. in 1914.

== See also ==
- Wilhelm scream
- Howie scream
- Goofy holler
- Castle thunder
