= Jonathan Frieman =

Political activist

Jonathan Frieman is a political activist who lives in Marin County, California, United States.

== "Corporate personhood" case ==
Frieman received major international media attention in January, 2013, when he deliberately got a traffic citation for driving in the carpool lane with incorporation papers that Frieman stated qualified him to be in the lane during the restricted hours. He contested the citation.

Frieman's defense states that the wording of the restrictive highway signage refers specifically to "persons"; therefore, case law is applicable, going back to U.S. legal decisions from the 19th century, including Santa Clara County v. Southern Pacific Railroad and to the more widely known 2010 "corporate personhood" case titled Citizens United v. Federal Election Commission. Frieman contends that, if corporations are indeed "persons", then carrying corporate papers in his car allows him to drive in the carpool lane. Stating: "Corporations are imaginary entities, and we've let them run wild," Frieman cites the California Vehicle Code, section 470, noting that under the wording of the freeway sign, his ticket for driving in the lane should be tossed out. Frieman's attorney Ford Greene observed: "When the corporate presence in our electoral process is financially dominant, by parity it appears appropriate to recognize such presence in an automobile. As of January 2013, Frieman has lost the first round of the case in Marin court, but an appeal is planned.

== Local activism ==
Frieman's local activism has drawn the wrath of the local newspaper, the Marin Independent Journal, who in a 2012 editorial called him "disrespectful" for his act of political satire regarding a local politician. The newspaper has also reported on Frieman's efforts against political campaigns, using independent expenditures, including the campaigns of Joe Nation, former Marin Supervisor Cynthia Murray, and Bob Marcucci. Frieman has also written op-ed pieces for the Marin Independent Journal, including a 2009 critique of the local chapter of the League of Women Voters who had proposed campaign financing reform that Frieman stated had "big loopholes."

=== Opposition to a Target store ===
A leader in an attempt to prevent a Target outlet from opening in San Rafael, Frieman helped lead the fight against city council approval as a spokesman for the group 'Keep It Local.'
