= Deadman's Curve =

1978 television film directed by Richard Compton

- Genre: Biography; Drama
- Based on: magazine article by Paul Morantz
- Written by: Dalene Young
- Directed by: Richard Compton
- Starring: Richard Hatch; Bruce Davison; Wolfman Jack; Susan Sullivan; Dick Clark; Jan Berry
- Composer: Fred Karlin
- Country of origin: United States
- Original language: English

Production
- Executive producers: Roger Gimbel; Tony Converse
- Producer: Pat Rooney
- Production locations: Tiny Naylor's Drive-In, La Brea Avenue & Sunset Blvd., Hollywood, Los Angeles, California; Villa Alámbra - 1966 Outpost Circle, Hollywood, Los Angeles, California
- Cinematography: William Cronjager
- Editor: Aaron Stell
- Running time: 100 min
- Production companies: Roger Gimbel Productions; EMI Television

Original release
- Network: CBS
- Release: February 3, 1978

Deadman's Curve is a 1978 American made-for-television biographical film based on the musical careers of Jan Berry and Dean Torrence. The film was developed from a 1974 article published in Rolling Stone by Paul Morantz, who also helped write the screenplay.

== Plot ==
As Jan and Dean rise to the top of the music industry, a horrible car accident leaves Jan incapacitated and their dreams shattered. With the help of Dean and others, Jan slowly recovers, learning again to walk and talk. A comeback to the music industry is seen as a slim chance, but with Jan willing to try, and with Dean right by his side, the duo aim for another shot.

== Cast ==
- Jan Berry: Richard Hatch
- Dean Torrence: Bruce Davison
- Annie: Pamela Bellwood
- Dr. Vivian Sheehan: Floy Dean
- Susan: Denise DuBarry
- Billy: Kelly Ward
- Bob "The Jackal" Smith: Bob "Wolfman Jack" Smith
- Rainbow: Susan Sullivan

Dick Clark and Beach Boys Mike Love and Bruce Johnston make cameo appearances, and Berry himself and his parents appear in the audience at the end of the movie.

== Production ==
In May 1977 CBS announced they would make the film. The film was one of the first telemovies made by EMI television.

"Doing the film was a chance to let the world know there was a reason Jan was no longer making records," said Dean. "He had gotten tired of hearing 'I thought you'd just retired from the business and faded into obscurity'."

The film inexplicably begins with Jan & Dean performing at a concert in July, 1966 hosted by Dick Clark. At that time Jan Berry was actually in the hospital, beginning the arduous task of recovering from his near-fatal car crash of three months earlier.

The film ends with Jan and Dean singing again triumphantly after the audience boos at them for lip synching. In reality, they attempted to perform in 1972 but were booed for lip synching. They did perform again in 1974. The film makes it seem like this happened on the same night.

=== Reception ===
The Los Angeles Times called it "shallow entertainment". The New York Times said the film was made "efficiently, if not imaginatively" with an "outstanding" performance from Davison.

Paul Mavis, of Drunk TV, reviewing Deadman's Curve after the death of Richard Hatch, wrote that although the made-for-TV movie skipped quite a few facts, and did little with Dean Torrence's character, the Jan & Dean music was still there, along with Richard Hatch's fine performance: "Cocky and exuberant at first, and then cold, sneering and manipulative as a domineering rock star, Hatch surprised me with the nasty edge he summoned up.... It’s a beautiful turn by Hatch in the classic biopic form: confidence, talent, and drive lead to success, but the ego needed to climb to the top proves to be an Achilles heel, leading to abuse of friends, loved ones, and self, and then to the inexorable downfall, before a painful but enlightening personal redemption."

=== Ratings ===
The movie was the 40th highest rating show of the week.

== Featured Songs ==
All songs featured are the original recordings, except where indicated

- "Dead Man's Curve"
- "Jennie Lee" (Jan & Dean version)
- "Baby Talk"
- "Surfin'"
- "Barbara Ann"
- "The Little Old Lady from Pasadena"
- "Sidewalk Surfin'"
- "Like a Summer Rain" (a Dean Torrence recording from the Save For a Rainy Day LP)
- "Surf City"

Jan and Dean's latter-day back-up band, Papa Doo Run Run (featuring Dean Torrence), went into the studio to record some additional songs for the soundtrack. Songs included "Pipeline," "Wipe Out," "I Only Have Eyes for You," "Get a Job", "A Teenager in Love," and "One Summer Night", all of which can be heard playing in the background as incidental music.

== Release history ==
"Deadman's Curve: The Jan and Dean Story" was released on VHS Format by Interglobal Home Video.
