= Paul Morantz =

American attorney and journalist (1945–2022)

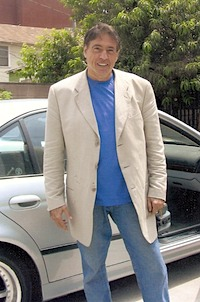
- Morantz in 2003
- Born: Paul Robert Morantz; August 16, 1945; Los Angeles, California, U.S.
- Died: October 23, 2022 (aged 77); Los Angeles, California, U.S.
- Education: USC School of Journalism; USC School of Law
- Occupations: Attorney; journalist; author
- Writing career
- Genres: Non-fiction; sports journalism
- Subjects: Cults; institutional abuse; college football
- Website: paulmorantz.com

Paul Robert Morantz (August 16, 1945 – October 23, 2022) was an American attorney and investigative journalist. He was known for taking legal cases alleging brainwashing by cults and self-help groups and for sexual misconduct by psychotherapists. His successful prosecution of Synanon led to an attempt against his life by means of a rattlesnake placed in his mailbox.

== Early life and career ==
Morantz was born and raised in Southern California. After high school, he served in the United States Army in 1963 for six months as a reservist. He then attended Santa Monica City College and the University of Southern California (USC) as a journalism major. Morantz became a sportswriter for the USC school newspaper the Daily Trojan. In 1967, he interviewed O. J. Simpson. Later that year he became co-sports editor of the Daily Trojan along with Lance Spiegel.

In 1968, the Los Angeles Times offered Morantz a job as a sportswriter but he chose to go to law school instead. While in law school, Morantz took a position writing for the Pigskin Review. He played for USC Law School in the basketball intramural league.

After graduation, Morantz became a Los Angeles public defender. He left the public defender's office in 1973 and worked part-time as both a lawyer and writer. During this time, he developed his feature-length article on surf singers Jan and Dean that was later published in Rolling Stone magazine and wrote the story for the made-for-television movie.

== Litigation history ==
=== Nursing home kidnappings ===
In 1974, Morantz uncovered a criminal conspiracy to kidnap homeless alcoholics and place them in nursing homes where they were kept sedated with Thorazine while the state was billed through Medical/Medicare and their social security checks taken. Los Angeles County supervisors called for a four-point probe on January 23, 1975, after hearing testimony that patients were often sedated, their ability to communicate with anyone outside the institution restricted, and were detained in facilities behind locked gates and barbed wire if they tried to leave. Morantz filed a class action lawsuit on behalf of the former patients, testified on nursing home abuses during the public hearings and aided in the creation of a district attorney task force on nursing home crimes.

=== Synanon ===
In 1977, Morantz investigated the drug rehabilitation institution Synanon, which had a reputation as a seemingly successful program for rehabilitating drug addicts where existing traditional hospitals had failed. Its founder, Charles Dederich, a former alcoholic, established Synanon in 1958 as a non-medical self-help program that included the "Game", a session in which participants acted out hostilities and sought the truth about themselves while not being bound by the truth in making critical attacks on each other. Synanon claimed it had cured thousands but by 1967, Dederich turned the organization into a "lifestyle" by recruiting non-addicts ("Squares") and building cities in Marin County, Tulare County and eventually Lake Havasu.

In 1974, Synanon declared itself a religion and centered on middle-class searching for utopia rather than addiction curing. By then Synanon's assets, including real estate, ten aircraft, 400 cars, trucks, and motorcycles, totaled around $33 million. Its advertising and specialty-gifts business netted $2.4 million in 1976, while donations and other income added another $5.5 million. Rules were passed mandating non-smoking, dieting, exercise programs, group marriages, shaved heads, vasectomies, abortions, and exchanging mates. Approximately 200 couples "changed partners". Members were trained in "Syndo" (martial arts) with the elite placed in the Imperial Marines, who were trained to commit violence against their enemies.

By 1977, Morantz was warning government authorities Dederich was mandating violence against its enemies ("a reign of terror") and filing lawsuits on behalf of ex-members and victims. Morantz would later state in 1985 that he was among 50 victims of a Synanon "reign of terror" from 1975 to 1978.

==== Rattlesnake attack ====
Synanon members began to exhibit violent behavior, which culminated in 1978 when Dederich inspired followers to try to kill Morantz. Three weeks earlier, Morantz had won a $300,000 judgment against Synanon on behalf of a married couple. The couple claimed the wife had been held captive by Synanon, and during her stay, leaders at Synanon attempted to brainwash her.

On October 10, 1978, Morantz was bitten by a rattlesnake placed in his mailbox, at his home in Pacific Palisades. A neighbor applied a tourniquet to save Morantz's life and called paramedics, who killed the snake. Police discovered the snake's rattle had been removed, allowing the snake to attack without warning. Morantz was hospitalized for six days.

=== Werner Erhard and est ===
In May 1978, Werner Erhard and est officials offered to train the entire city of Parlier, located in the San Joaquin Valley, for free. Two city councilmen who had taken training endorsed it but many town members dropped out after training started and a controversy over est's presence in the community arose. Morantz came to Parlier to help the town. Morantz called the free training offer an attempt to use the tools of coercive persuasion on an entire community. "The whole thing I saw there scared me", said Morantz. "It really was one of the scarier things I've ever seen."

Morantz then went to Deputy Chief Barry Wade of the Los Angeles Police Department and the LAPD police union in effort to stop est from providing free est trainings for LAPD officers. After Morantz's contact and warnings, LAPD and its Union ended associations and training with est after one session had taken place.

=== The Center for Feeling Therapy ===
Morantz represented approximately forty ex-members of the Center for Feeling Therapy who, after nine years, rebelled against the center, leading to its closure in 1980. Many of its former members later sued the founding therapists in what was then the largest psychology malpractice lawsuit in California history. The center, a product of the Human Potential Movement, splintered from Primal Therapy and was led by Richard "Riggs" Corriere and Joseph Hart who referred to themselves as the "Butch Cassidy and Sundance kid of Psychotherapy" and as the "New Freuds". It also resulted in the removal of many of their therapists’ licenses.

During the course of litigation, the California Court of Appeals in Rains v. Superior Court (Center for Feeling Therapy Psychological Corp.) ruled in Morantz's favor that the center's use of physical punching ("Sluggo therapy") could be the basis for a battery claim despite patient consent to being hit.

Seven years after the therapeutic community ended, Corriere and Hart's licenses were removed. Four psychologists were found guilty of acts of gross negligence, incompetence, patient abuse, aiding and abetting the unlicensed practice of psychology, and false advertising after a 94-day hearing before Administrative Law Judge Robert A. Neher.

=== Molko v. Holy Spirit Association for the Unification of World Christianity ===
Morantz gave pro-bono assistance to the plaintiffs in the Molko case in which the California Supreme Court would decide if religious organizations could be sued for deceitful brainwashing. In 1988, following his investigation into the Unification Church, the state high court held that religious organizations may be sued for fraud and intentional infliction of emotional distress when they use brainwashing techniques.

=== John Gottuso ===
In 1988, Morantz successfully took on representation of former female patients of preacher-psychotherapist John Gottuso for sexual misconduct with his patients as an aid to their psychological and spiritual life. As a result, the pastor/therapist of Park View Christian Fellowship in California lost his license to practice psychotherapy as well as the right to be involved in his church's pre-school.

A decade later, Morantz again represented another six adults and five former students in a 1996 civil lawsuit against Gottuso, his church, and its private school. The suit for sexual abuse and psychological abuse was settled in March 1998 for $3,200,000. In response to this case, California passed related legislation prohibiting private school teachers who, by their past actions, could not teach in public schools.

=== Other cases, legislation and law enforcement ===
Morantz litigated against the Church of Scientology, Peoples Temple, Hare Krishnas, Rajneesh movement, and other religious groups. He also worked alongside of anti-cult attorney Ford Greene and Los Angeles County class action lawsuit attorney Thomas Girardi.

Morantz collaborated with thought reform theorists and anti-cultist authors such as Margaret Singer and Louis Jolyon West among others. He helped write the California law setting forth requirements under which a religious organization could be sued for punitive damages.

In Hall v. Great Western Bank (1991) 231 Cal. App. 3d 713 [282 Cal.Rptr. 640] Morantz argued successfully banks could not fire employees for reasons that would violate public policy.

In 2013, the City Council of Santa Monica gave Morantz a commendation signed by the Santa Monica Mayor for his cases against Synanon and dedication to welfare of others.

== Personal life ==
Morantz had one child, Chaz, who survived him. He died on October 23, 2022, at his home in Los Angeles. He was 77 years old.

== Publications and other works ==
Books

- Morantz, Paul; Lancaster, Hal (2013). Escape: My Lifelong War Against Cults (2nd ed.). Los Angeles: Cresta Publications. ISBN 978-0-18-213220-1.
- Morantz, Paul (October 28, 2014). From Miracle to Madness: The True Story of Charles Dederich and Synanon (1st ed.). Los Angeles: Cresta Publications. ISBN 978-0-692-29966-1.

Journalism

- PINK JUSTICE—The Trial of Judge Noel Cannon (or How I saved the Los Angeles Municipal Court), The Los Angeles Times (1967).
- The Technique of Scouting, University of Southern California Pigskin Review (1969).
- They Call it Sam's Corner, University of Southern California Pigskin Review (1970).
- Incident at Lola's, West Magazine supplement of The Los Angeles Times (1972)
- Anthony Davis Superstar, Are You What They Say You Are?, Los Angeles Magazine (1973).
- The Road Back From Dead Man's Curve: The Tragic Life of Jan Berry with & without Dean Torrence, Rolling Stone magazine (1974).
- The Fingerprint that lied: How a crime lab framed William DePalma, Coast Magazine (1975).
- Lindh: a Young Man Caught in Evil's Net, The Los Angeles Times (January 2002).
- The Devil and John Walker, Freedom of Mind Center (2002).
- Of Nazis and guillotines Santa Monica Daily Press (May 12, 2015).
- CHASING ANNIE HALL Boryanabooks (September 1, 2015).
- Where Have You Gone Dirty Harry?.
- There Goes The Robert E. Lee(2015).

Screenplays

- Deadman's Curve, CBS-TV film based on the musical careers of Jan Berry and Dean Torrence that aired in 1978 and 1979.
