= Ford Greene =

American lawyer

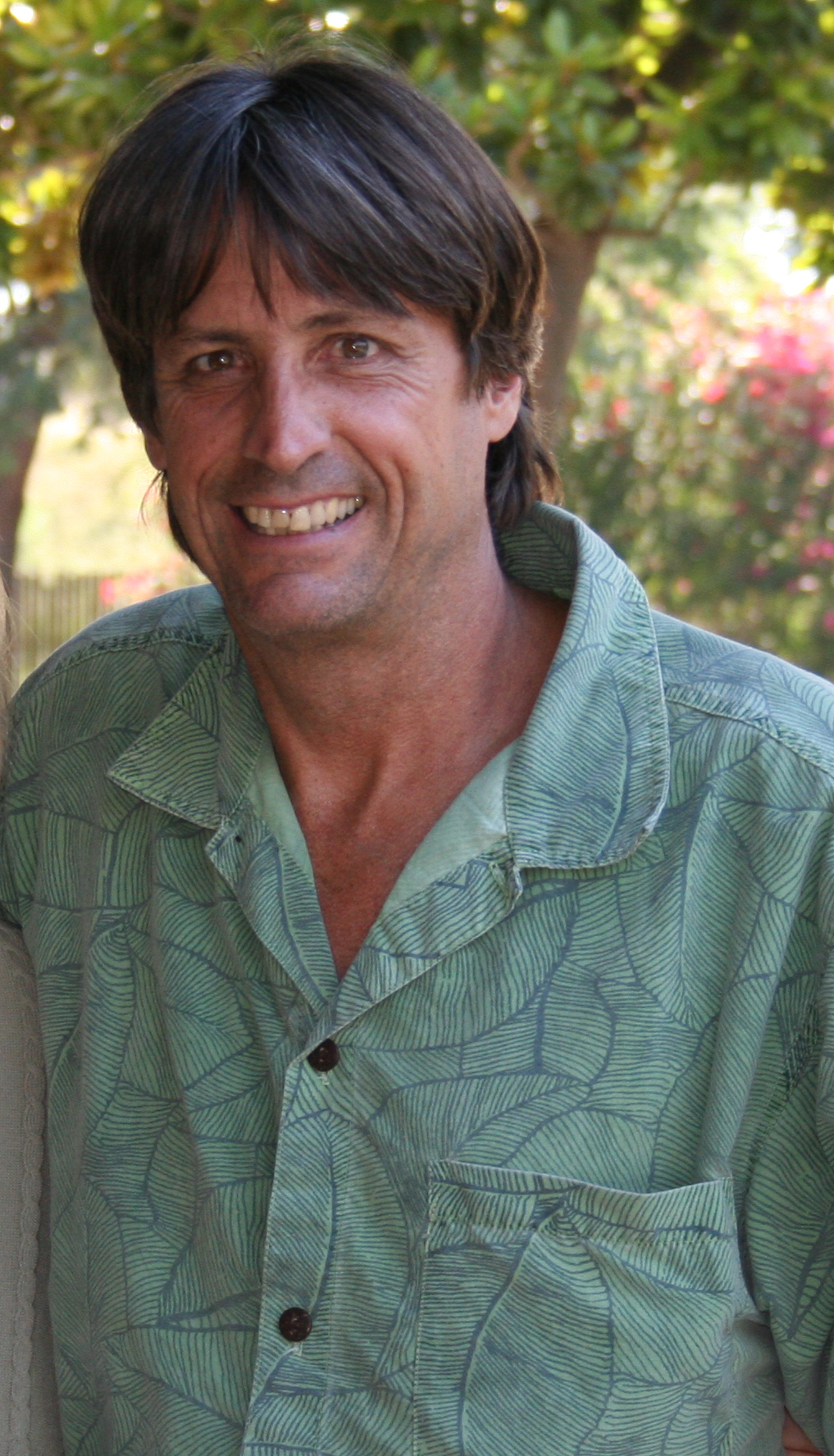
- Aylsworth Crawford Greene III
- Born: December 21, 1952 (age 73); United States
- Occupations: Attorney, Town Councilman in San Anselmo, California

Aylsworth Crawford Greene III (born December 21, 1952) – known as Ford Greene – is an American attorney, political leader and three-time Mayor of San Anselmo, California. Greene is noted for having successfully conducted litigation against the Church of Scientology and the Unification Church of the United States. He has also been a deprogrammer. Starting in 2007, for fifteen years Greene served four consecutive terms as an elected San Anselmo town council member. During that time his co-council members voted him to the position of Mayor in 2011, 2015, and 2019.

== Early life ==
Ford Greene was born in San Francisco, California, and grew up in Ross, Marin County, California. He is the only boy of four children of Daphne Dibble and A. Crawford Greene Jr. He attended Ross Grammar School, The Thacher School, Redwood (public) High School and graduated from the Woodside Priory School. His great great Grandfather was Henry Clay Dibble, a state legislator in both Louisiana and California. In California Dibble was responsible for the enactment of Civil Code 51, the precursor of the United States Civil Rights Act. His father and grandfather had both been attorneys and partners at McCutchen, Doyle, Brown & Enersen in San Francisco.

Desperate and depressed after a victimizing incident at the age of 19, his life spiraled for a few years. In 1974 he was recruited into the Moonies after a failed attempt to rescue his sister Catherine from the cult, but after eight months he left, and instead joined his mother's anti-cult crusade. For a while Greene became a deprogrammer, "hired by parents to pluck their sons and daughters from cults". Greene estimated he deprogrammed more than 100 people over the next several years. In 1978 he enrolled at New College of California School of Law "to better equip himself for the anti-cult crusade in which he had already enlisted". Greene was admitted to the State Bar of California in 1983.

The deprogrammer character in the film Ticket to Heaven was based on his work.

== Litigating against the Moon Organization ==
In Molko v. Holy Spirit Association for the Unification of World Christianity, Greene represented two former members of the Unification Church, David Molko and Tracy Leal, before the California Supreme Court. (Paul Morantz, in an amicus curiae on behalf of the Cult Awareness Network, also briefed and argued the case.) In 1988, the state high court held that religious organizations may be sued for fraud and intentional infliction of emotional distress when they use deception to cause candidates for recruitment to unwittingly expose themselves to brainwashing techniques. The members of the Unification Church who recruited Molko had lied by denying any religious connection to their recruitment pitch, and then when he trusted them, brainwashing him. In a legal opinion written by Justice Stanley Mosk regarding tactics religious groups use to attract followers, the court found that any burden on the free exercise of religion was outweighed by the state's interest in protecting against "fraudulent induction of unconsenting individuals into an atmosphere of coercive persuasion" because many people exposed to brainwashing techniques without their knowledge or consent would develop serious and sometimes irreversible physical and psychiatric disorders, up to and including schizophrenia, self-mutilation, and suicide. The defendants appealed to the United States Supreme Court which refused to review the decision of the California Supreme Court, and the case was settled out of court.

In 1998, in Bertolucci v. Ananda Church of Self Realization, Greene won a US$1.625 million jury verdict for fraud, coercion and sexual exploitation of a woman devotee.

== Litigating against the Scientology Organization ==
Greene has represented a number of clients against the Church of Scientology. In Wollersheim v. Church of Scientology of California, he was part of a team that represented former Scientologist Lawrence Wollersheim and successfully sued for emotional distress. Wollersheim had been a member of the Church of Scientology for over a decade, leaving in 1979, and sued the church the following year. The court case was heard in 1986. Wollersheim had been a supervisor in Scientology's elite Sea Org group, and his duties included recruiting celebrities to Scientology. The case resulted in a US$2.5 million judgment that grew into a US$8.7 million payout due to accumulated interest after over 20 years of litigation. In New York City's Village Voice newspaper in June 2008, Greene commented: "If it had been shown in court that the 350 organizations of the church of Scientology were all controlled by [Scientology leader] David Miscavige, it doesn't look like a legitimate religion but the authoritative cult that it is. It would have been terrible public relations, and they still would have had to pay the money. And that's why they paid the money when they did, to avoid the bad PR".

Some of Scientology's highest-ranking members have disagreed with Greene in print interviews: Kurt Weiland, Director of external affairs for the Church of Scientology's Office of Special Affairs, Scientology's vice president of communications and a member of the organization's Board of Directors, has stated "We don't react kindly to attempts to extort money from the church, especially if it's done through lies and allegations by people like Ford Greene." Kendrick Moxon, Scientology's lead counsel gathered information on Greene as part of what he termed a "simple, standard check".

Greene also successfully represented client Raul Lopez against the church; Lopez had sustained partial brain damage in an auto accident and turned to Scientology, subsequently donating or "investing" most of his 1.7 million-dollar accident settlement money to the church.

== Free speech activism ==
From 2003 to 2005, Greene was involved in a controversy about a changeable "Freedom" sign with political messages on the side of his San Anselmo law office, facing eastbound traffic on busy Sir Francis Drake Blvd. Greene was vehement regarding his opposition to the policies of President George W. Bush, one example being Greene's recommendation for his readers to "defy evil Bushism".

After San Anselmo police removed his sign in 2003, Greene sued the city. After a new sign ordinance was passed limiting the size of signs to 6 square feet (0.56 m^{2}), Greene put up 16 small signs together to form a large one. A court declined to stop this, deciding that the town could only limit the size, not the number of signs. Greene settled the dispute in October 2005 by agreeing to use only half the space for messages, and was reimbursed by the town for nearly a thousand U.S. dollars in expenses.

== Publicly elected service ==
In November 2005, Greene ran for a seat on the San Anselmo Town Council against Ian Roth, but came 300 votes short of being elected. Roth resigned in September 2006. Greene interviewed to be appointed to the Council seat he had nearly won, but former Ross Hospital CEO Judy House was chosen by the Council in a 4–0 vote. Greene said "It was a done deal. I'm not going anywhere. There's an election in a year".

Greene was elected to the San Anselmo Town Council in November 2007. "There was a compost pile that needed to be turned," Greene said when the election results became known. He believed that "The government in this town was so embedded, so self-absorbed, that a substantial number of the population didn't like it. That was the issue". Greene was elected by the council to the position of mayor in December 2010.

He was re-elected to the council on November 8, 2011. Greene stated he would "continue on the same path, emphasizing open and responsive government and looking at planning and regulatory codes to make them more accessible and friendly to residents of San Anselmo".

Greene won a third term on the San Anselmo Town Council on November 3, 2015. He was the only seated councilman to speak against the proposal to turn a San Anselmo park into a flood basin, and a citizen-emplaced ballot measure supported by Greene that was designed to prevent the flood-basin proposal also won, despite opposition by Marin County political figures. Regarding his opponents, Greene said that "I'm very grateful for the intelligence and good judgment of the San Anselmo voters, who were able to see through a very well orchestrated, unified and negative campaign." A few weeks later Greene was voted by the council to his second term as mayor.

On November 5, 2019, Greene was again re-elected to the Town Council. He had included in his platform storefront sales of recreational cannabis, to be taxed by San Anselmo. As the sole candidate of four to take a stand against a ballot proposal, Measure M, designed to fund park renovations with a thirty-year parcel tax, Greene was vindicated when the town voters turned down the proposal overwhelmingly. Greene credited his return for a fourth term to his playing fair with his constituents, saying it was "Because I'm straight. I'm stand-up. I'm accountable, open, honest and responsive and make the right decisions. Being the only candidate to oppose Measure M is illustrative of that. It's sensitivity to what local people want. It's customer service."

== See also ==
- Anti-cult movement
- List of anti-cult organizations and individuals
