= Primal therapy =

Psychotherapy of Arthur Janov

Primal therapy (also known as primal scream therapy) is a trauma-based psychotherapy created by Arthur Janov during the 1960s, who argued that neurosis is caused by the repressed pain of childhood trauma. Janov argued that repressed pain can be sequentially brought to conscious awareness for resolution through re-experiencing specific incidents and fully expressing the resulting pain during therapy. Primal therapy was developed as a means of eliciting the repressed pain; the term Pain is capitalized in discussions of primal therapy when referring to any repressed emotional distress and its purported long-lasting psychological effects. Janov believed that talking therapies deal primarily with the cerebral cortex and higher-reasoning areas and do not access the source of Pain within the more basic parts of the central nervous system.

Primal therapy is used to re-experience childhood pain—i.e., felt rather than conceptual memories—in an attempt to resolve the pain through complete processing and integration, becoming real. An intended objective of the therapy is to lessen or eliminate the hold early trauma exerts on adult behaviour.

Primal therapy became very influential during a brief period in the early 1970s after the publication of Janov's first book, The Primal Scream. It inspired hundreds of spin-off clinics worldwide and served as an inspiration for many popular cultural icons. Singer-songwriter John Lennon, actor James Earl Jones, and pianist Roger Williams were prominent advocates of primal therapy. Primal therapy has since declined in popularity; however, proponents of the methodology continue to advocate and practice the therapy or variations of it.

Primal therapy is not accepted in the field of psychology. Psychologists have criticized its lack of controlled outcome trials which would demonstrate effectiveness. Nevertheless, Janov continued to advocate the therapy up until his death in 2017, and primal therapy is still practiced by a few clinicians worldwide.

== Concepts ==
Janov stated that neurosis is the result of suppressed pain, which is the result of trauma, usually trauma of childhood origin. According to Janov, the only way to reverse neurosis is for the neurotic to recall their trauma in a therapeutic setting. Janov contended that the neurotic can thereby re-experience their feelings in response to the original traumatic incidents but can now express the emotions that at that time were repressed, thereby resolving the trauma.

Janov believed that there is only one source of mental illness (besides genetic defects): imprinted pain. He argued that this unitary source of neurosis implies that there can be only one effective cure: re-experiencing.

=== Pain ===
In primal theory, "Primal Pain is deprivation or injury which threatens the developing child. A parent's warning is not necessarily a Primal Pain for the child. Utter humiliation is... An infant left to cry it out in the crib is in Pain... It is not hurt as such which defines Primal Pain but rather the context of the hurt or its meaning to the impressionable developing consciousness of the child."

Janov described "Pain" as the pain that does not hurt because, as soon as the person goes into it, it becomes simply feeling. Most of the suffering is in the blockage or repression, not the Pain itself.

=== Needs ===
Janov believed that much of the pain of childhood is the result of needs going unmet. Drawing from earlier psychologists, he described his take on the basic needs in his books. "Our first needs are solely physical ones for nourishment, safety and comfort. Later we have emotional needs for affection, understanding and respect for our feelings. Finally, intellectual needs to know and to understand emerge."

Janov asserted that when needs go unfulfilled for too long, pain is the result.

=== Consciousness and repression ===
In primal theory, consciousness is not simply awareness but refers to a state of the entire organism, including the brain, in which there is "fluid access" between the parts. Using the triune brain work by Paul D. MacLean and adapting it to Primal Theory, three levels of consciousness are recognized in Primal Theory.

The following table summarizes some of the fundamental ideas and terms Janov (J) has used as well as conventional terms used in general and scientific papers.

Level/Line (J)	Technical name	Functions mediated	Brain structures involved	Incorporates (J)
Third	cognitive	cognition and intellectual faculties	neocortex	thinking mind
Second	affective	emotional responses	limbic system	feeling mind
First	somatosensory	sensation and visceral responses	brainstem	survival mind

- Janov described defenses as the agents of repression that protect the system from the catastrophic Pain of unfulfilled need. When referring to Pain or defense the word line is used instead of level; e.g. first-line Pain = early trauma imprinted in the brainstem usually involving physical injury, third line defense = intellectual defense.
- The brainstem has also often been referred to as the reptilian brain as it is the structure which mammals have in common with reptiles.
- First-line imprints occur before intellectual abilities, such as the use of verbal language, have developed. They are at the level of pure sensation and visceral (or gut) reaction. The brainstem is capable of processing the most primitive emotions of rage and terror, and these can be experienced very early in life.

According to Janov, Primal Pains are imprinted in the lower brain first, then later the limbic system, and still later intellectual defenses are formed by the cortex simply because this is the sequence of neurological development. The therapy therefore occurs in the reverse sequence: "There is no way to go deep without first going shallow." In primal therapy, medication is prescribed for some "overloaded" patients, so they do not overshoot into first-line pains that they are not ready to feel, thereby allowing them to feel the more recent pains first.

=== Origins of neurosis ===
Primal theory contends that many or most people suffer from some degree of neurosis. This neurosis begins very early in life (especially in the "critical period"—birth plus the first three years) as a result of needs not being met. There may be one or more isolated traumatic events, but more often, it is a case of daily neglect or abuse.

Neurosis therefore may begin to develop at birth, or even before, with first-line Pains. Subsequent Pain is thought to be added on top of previous pain in what is called "compounding" the Pain.

Throughout childhood, more elaborate "defenses" develop, as the early unmet needs keep pressing for satisfaction in symbolic, and therefore inevitably unsatisfying, ways.

== Format and process ==
The overall strategy of primal therapy has hardly changed from the early days. The therapy begins with an intensive three weeks of fifteen open-ended sessions with one therapist. After this, the patient joins group meetings with other patients and therapists once or twice a week for as long as is needed. Private sessions are still available, though not every day. The length of time needed in formal therapy varies from person to person.

=== Primal ===
As a noun or a verb, the word primal denotes the reliving of an early painful feeling. A complete primal has been found, according to Janov and Holden, to be marked by a "pre-primal" rise in vital signs such as pulse, core body temperature, and blood pressure leading up to the feeling experience and then a falling off of those vital signs to a more normal level than where they began. After the primal ("post-primal"), Janov claimed the patient will be flooded with his own insights.

Based on Janov's own in-house studies, Janov and Holden concluded that the pre-primal rise in vital signs indicates the person's neurotic defenses are being stretched by the ascending Pain to the point of producing an "acute anxiety attack" (the conventional description), and the fall to more normal levels than pre-primal levels indicates a degree of resolution of the Pain.

Janov distinguished the primal from emotional Catharsis or abreaction, an abreaction being a "pseudo-primal". A primal may be referred to as a "connected feeling", but a complete connected feeling will usually take months or even years to feel in many primals. Psychiatrist Anthony Storr claimed that primal therapy techniques have much in common with abreaction.

=== Duration ===
In The Primal Scream (published in January 1970), Janov wrote, "By the time someone has reached his eighth month he is generally well...Many patients finish before the eight months; some remain in therapy for ten or eleven months. It all depends on how sick they were to begin with."

A therapist working for Janov stated in 1973: "The need for therapy really never ends. Nobody is ever able to flush all the pain from his body." According to this source, there were patients who stayed in therapy for as long as two years.

In The New Primal Scream (published in 1991), Janov wrote that after a year to a year and a half, patients are able to continue therapy on their own, with only sporadic follow-up necessary.

=== Cost ===
In The Primal Scream (Chapter 8), Janov wrote: "Primal therapy is much more economical than conventional insight therapy—not only in financial terms but also in the time involved. The total financial outlay is about one-fifth the cost of a psychoanalysis."

In 1971, the three-week intensive (two to four daily hours) had a cost of $1,650 USD. In 1973, the cost—payable in advance—was US$6,000 for six months of therapy. In 1978, a year of primal therapy had a cost of US$6,600.

== Reports ==
Over the decades since Janov's first book on the subject, there have been several reports and critiques relating to primal therapy in books and peer-reviewed journals.

Janov initiated from the outset small-scale research using questionnaires and measures of EEG, body temperature, blood pressure, and pulse from his patients. A 1971 Pittsburgh Press article cited a University of California, Irvine study on primal therapy patients that showed a slowing of brain waves. Janov claimed that primal therapy reduced, in some patients, the frequency and the amplitude of Alpha waves, core body temperature (as much as three degrees) and blood pressure (as much as 30 percent). Two Brain Research Institute (UCLA) scientists confirmed that there were brain-wave changes in primal patients.

Authors Prochaska and Norcross called the research by Janov "largely uncontrolled, non comparative and short term."

A small uncontrolled outcome study of 13 primal patients showed that 8 were definitively improved on all outcome measures, with 1 bad outcome. The authors concluded that primal therapy warrants further study.

=== Tomas Videgård's The Success and Failure of Primal Therapy ===
In an early account of the results of primal therapy, Tomas Videgård reported on a study of a sample of 32 patients who entered therapy at The Primal Institute in 1975 and 1976.

The outcome evaluation for the patients was 4 Very Good, 9 Good, 8 Medium, 6 Bad (including one suicide), and 5 Unavailable for post-testing (left therapy prematurely). Patients in the sample had been in therapy for between 15 and 32 months. Patients were evaluated based on patients' answers to questions and some projective tests interpreted by Videgård himself.

Videgård concluded that therapy at The Primal Institute was marginally better than the Tavistock Clinic and markedly better than the Menninger Foundation—the two psychotherapy clinics he used for comparison. Videgård wrote, "The outcome is about half as good as Janov claims the results of PT to be," calculating a 40 percent success rate, compared with a 98–100 percent success rate claimed by Janov.

== Criticism ==
Primal therapy is not accepted in the field of psychology. It is regarded as one of the least credible forms of psychotherapy and has been classified in a 2006 APA Delphi poll as "discredited". It has been frequently criticized as lacking outcome studies to substantiate its effectiveness. Some researchers have suggested that Janov's claim that adults can recall infantile experiences is refuted.

In a 1982 paper published in the journal Zeitschrift für Psychosomatische Medizin und Psychoanalyse, Ehebald and Werthmann report that, following a review of the scientific literature, they found "no on-going reports of primal therapy's therapeutic results, no statistical studies and no follow-up studies." Concluding that primal therapy is not a valid therapeutic technique, they stated that most psychotherapists in the Federal Republic of Germany believe it to be questionable in theory and dangerous in practice.

Alice Miller was a strong proponent of primal therapy. Later, however, she developed some misgivings and hesitations about it. She stated that primal therapy could be dangerous when conducted by inadequately trained therapists, that there was "too much faith" in cathartic discharge, and that the structure of the initial three-week intensive could provide opportunities for unscrupulous therapists.

According to Stanislav Grof, many patients stayed in primal therapy for years with no substantial progress. According to Grof, the clinical state of some patients actually worsened.

In 1996, authors Starker and Pankratz published in Psychological Reports a study of 300 randomly sampled psychologists. Participants were asked for their views about the soundness of methods of mental health treatment. Primal therapy was identified as one of the approaches "most in question as to soundness."

Martin Gardner wrote a critical article called Primal Therapy: A Persistent New Age Therapy in the Skeptical Inquirer. Gardner claims there is not even the "slightest evidence" that adults can recall memories of the first few years of life. Gardner also details a protest over the publication of Janov's book The Biology of Love, which is referred to as "Bogus Psychiatry".

== History ==
Primal Therapy began in 1967, when Janov had a pivotal psychotherapy session with Danny Wilson (a pseudonym). Danny Wilson was very disturbed over an experimental theater performance he had recently seen, during which the performer shouted "Mama!" repeatedly. Janov insistently encouraged Danny Wilson to shout "Mama!" again during the therapy session. Wilson did so, and eventually fell to the floor in emotional pain for half an hour. Janov taped the session and reheard it repeatedly. He did not understand its meaning until years later.

Janov later asked another therapy patient to shout "Mama!" at a pivotal moment, and that patient also achieved some kind of emotional release. Janov subsequently experimented with his patients in 1967 and 1968. Janov developed a theory of psychopathology that neurosis is caused by repressed emotional memories of childhood trauma and could be resolved by re-experiencing and expressing.

In 1968, The Primal Institute was founded by Arthur Janov and his first wife, Vivian. In 1970, Arthur Janov published his first book, The Primal Scream. In March, Arthur and Vivian started treating John Lennon and Yoko Ono.

Primal therapy became very influential during a brief period in the early 1970s, after the publication of The Primal Scream. It inspired hundreds of spin-off clinics worldwide and served as an inspiration for many popular cultural icons.

In 1971, two trainee primal therapists, Joseph Hart and Richard Corriere, abandoned Arthur Janov and started the Center for Feeling Therapy. Hart claimed: "When we left Janov, forty percent of the patients came with us....we found that most had been faking their primals."

== Notable patients ==
A number of prominent actors and performers underwent primal therapy during the 1970s and later advocated it. Actor James Earl Jones, pianist Roger Williams, and actress Dyan Cannon underwent primal therapy and advocated it.

Apple Inc. co-founder Steve Jobs experimented with primal therapy, but later "grew bored and disdainful" of it.

The British pop band Tears for Fears was directly inspired by Janov's writings.

=== John Lennon ===
Beatles member John Lennon and his wife Yoko Ono went through primal therapy in 1970. A copy of the just-released The Primal Scream arrived in the mail at Lennon's home Tittenhurst Park. Lennon was impressed, and he requested primal therapy to be started at Tittenhurst. Lennon and Ono had three weeks of intensive treatment in England before Janov returned to Los Angeles, where they had four months of therapy.

Lennon ended primal therapy after four or five months. Lennon commented after therapy, "I still think that Janov's therapy is great, you know, but I do not want to make it a big Maharishi thing" and "I just know myself better, that's all. I can handle myself better." and "I no longer have any need for drugs, the Maharishi or the Beatles. I am myself and I know why." Janov himself, said that, "We had opened him up, and we didn't have time to put him back together again."

Shortly after therapy, Lennon produced his album John Lennon/Plastic Ono Band. (Ono recorded a parallel album, Yoko Ono/Plastic Ono Band, from her experiences.) Lennon's album featured a number of songs that were directly affected by his experience in therapy, including "Remember", "I Found Out", "Isolation", "God", "Mother", "My Mummy's Dead", "Well Well Well," and "Working Class Hero", as were a number of songs from his Imagine album, including "How?", "Crippled Inside", and his rewriting of "Oh My Love".

== See also ==
- Primal Scream (disambiguation)
- Attachment therapy
- Center for Feeling Therapy
- Pre- and perinatal psychology
- Primal integration
- List of topics characterized as pseudoscience

== Bibliography ==
- Alexander, Theresa (1997). Facing the Wolf: Inside the Process of Deep Feeling Therapy. Plume. ISBN 0452275210.
- Holden, E. Michael; Janov, Arthur (1975). Primal man: the new consciousness. New York: Crowell. ISBN 978-0-690-01015-2.
- Janov, Arthur (1970). The Primal Scream (A Delta Book). Dell Publishing Company. ISBN 978-0-349-11829-1.
- Janov, Arthur (1991). The new primal scream: primal therapy 20 years on. [Wilmington, Del.]: Enterprise Pub. ISBN 978-0-942103-23-6.
- Janov, Arthur (2006). Primal Healing: Access the Incredible Power of Feelings to Improve Your Health. Franklin Lakes, N.J.: New Page Books. ISBN 978-1-56414-916-9.
- Reese, Robert T. (1988). Healing fits: the cure of an epileptic. Los Angeles: Big Sky Press. ISBN 978-0-944592-00-7.
- Videgård, Tomas (1984). The success and failure of primal therapy: 32 patients treated at the Primal Institute (Janov) viewed in the perspective of object relations theory. Stockholm: Almqvist & Wiksell International. ISBN 978-91-22-00698-5.
- Complete list of books by Arthur Janov
