= The Primal Scream =

1970 book by Arthur Janov

The Primal Scream. Primal Therapy: The Cure for Neurosis
- Cover of the first edition
- Author: Arthur Janov
- Language: English
- Subject: Primal therapy
- Publisher: Dell Publishing
- Publication date: 1970
- Publication place: United States
- Media type: Print (Hardcover and Paperback)
- Pages: 446
- ISBN: 0-349-11834-5

The Primal Scream. Primal Therapy: The Cure for Neurosis (1970; second edition 1999) is a book by the psychologist Arthur Janov, in which the author describes his experiences with patients during the months he developed primal therapy. Although Janov's claims were questioned by psychologists, the book was popular and brought Janov fame and popular success, which inspired other therapists to start offering primal therapy.

== Summary ==
This book gives an account of the development of primal therapy. The book starts with an account of a group therapy session in 1967, during which a young man (Danny Wilson) underwent some kind of emotional catharsis during the therapy session. The young man was encouraged by Janov to call out for his mommy and daddy, which he did, only to fall into involuntary convulsions. After which, the young man announced "I can feel", and he then had some kind of emotional resolution.

In the remainder of the book, Janov develops a general theory of neurosis. Janov claims that neurosis is caused by repressed emotional pain from childhood trauma, and can be cured by reliving and expressing. Janov claims in the book that all neurosis is caused by repressed childhood emotional trauma, and that reliving is the only effective cure which really addresses the root cause of the problem.

The book contains numerous testimonials but little scientific evidence. The book is based upon Janov's theorizing after experimenting with his patients from 1967 to 1970.

== Influence and reception ==
The Primal Scream was a popular success. It reportedly sold more than one million copies internationally, and was read by tens of thousands of people in the United States. Albert Goldman reported in The Lives of John Lennon (1988) that Janov sent pre-publication copies of The Primal Scream to celebrities such as John Lennon and Mick Jagger, and that Lennon subsequently underwent primal therapy with Janov, which provided the basis of his first proper solo album, John Lennon/Plastic Ono Band. According to The New York Times, The Primal Scream "attracted wide attention in newspapers and magazines" and made Janov a celebrity. The fame and success it brought Janov inspired many therapists who had not met him to offer imitation primal therapy, and led to the proliferation of programs offering happiness through radical personal transformation.

Early reviews in the popular press were mixed. The book critic Robert Kirsch cautioned about Janov's "hyperbole" and "evangelic certainty" in the Los Angeles Times, but nevertheless called him an impressive writer and thinker and concluded that The Primal Scream was "worth reading and considering." The Primal Scream was praised by the Chattanooga Times and the Berkeley Gazette, both of which compared Janov to Freud. However, psychologists immediately questioned the assertions Janov made in the book, pointing out the "unverifiability of its central claim of the existence of primal pain and the lack of independent, controlled studies demonstrating the therapy’s effectiveness".

Erin Shoemaker criticized Janov's ideas about homosexuality in the gay magazine The Body Politic, noting that clinical studies contradicted Janov's view that girls become lesbians through being seduced by older women and that Janov did not have a clear idea of what constituted "real" behavior. The psychoanalyst Joel Kovel argued in A Complete Guide to Therapy (1976) that The Primal Scream shows that Janov is one of several figures in the history of psychotherapy who have come to be seen as savior figures. He credited Janov with tapping a "bedrock of great emotional power." The Primal Scream was reviewed in BMJ in 2012.
