= Arthur Janov =

American psychologist, psychotherapist and writer

- Born: August 21, 1924; Los Angeles, California, U.S.
- Died: October 1, 2017 (aged 93); Malibu, California, U.S.
- Other name: Art Janov
- Education: University of California, Los Angeles; Claremont Graduate School
- Occupations: Psychologist, psychotherapist, writer
- Years active: 1952–2017
- Known for: Creator of Primal therapy
- Notable work: The Primal Scream
- Spouses: Vivian Glickenstein (m. 1949; div. 1980) France Daunic (m. 1980)

Arthur Janov (/ˈdʒænəv/; August 21, 1924 – October 1, 2017), also known as Art Janov, was an American psychologist, psychotherapist, and writer. He gained notability as the creator of primal therapy, a treatment for mental illness that involves repeatedly descending into, feeling, and experiencing long-repressed childhood pain. Janov first directed a psychotherapy institute called the Primal Institute on North Almont Dr. in West Hollywood, California and from 1980 at the Janov Primal Center at 1205 Abbot Kinney Boulevard, in Venice, Los Angeles and latterly on Ashland Avenue in Santa Monica, California.

Janov was the author of many books, most notably The Primal Scream (1970), as well as The Biology of Love and Life Before Birth: The Hidden Script That Rules our Lives.

== Early life ==
Arthur Janov was born in Los Angeles, California, and grew up in Boyle Heights, a low income neighborhood east of Downtown L.A., populated mainly by Jews, Latinos, and Slavic immigrants. Janov was the son of two Russian-Jewish immigrants, Conrad Janov and Anne Coretsky-Janov. He received his B.A. and M.S.W. in psychiatric social work from the University of California, Los Angeles, and his Ph.D. in psychology from Claremont Graduate School in 1960.

== Career ==
Janov originally practiced conventional psychotherapy in his native California. He did an internship at the Hacker Psychiatric Clinic in Beverly Hills, worked for the Veterans' Administration at Brentwood Neuropsychiatric Hospital and was in private practice from 1952 until his death in 2017. He was also on the staff of the Psychiatric Department at Los Angeles Children's Hospital where he was involved in developing their psychosomatic unit.

In Janov's view, the repressed pain of traumatic childhood experiences eventually produces an emotionally damaged adult. These experiences include not only obvious physical and psychological injuries, but also subtle slights like parents' failure to comfort a child.

Janov wrote that his professional life changed in a single day in 1967 with the discovery of what he called "Primal Pain". During a therapy session, Janov heard what he describes as, "an eerie scream welling up from the depths of a young man lying on the floor". He developed primal therapy, in which clients are encouraged to re-live and express what Janov considered repressed memories and feelings.

Janov's primal therapy became a cultural phenomenon in the 1970s and 1980s along with his work The Primal Scream (1970). In response to criticism claiming that primal therapy is discredited and harmful, Janov said in 2016: "We have 50 years of published material to the contrary. We have several scientific articles in the journal Activitas Nervosa Superior, plus other journals. We do serious science and leave the nonsense to others".

The idea of The Primal Scream came when one of his patients told of a theatrical performance at Conway Hall, London, in which Raphael Montañez Ortiz dressed in diapers shouted "Mommy! Daddy! Mommy! Daddy!" throughout the act, then vomited, distributing plastic bags to the spectators and later asking them to vomit as well. Janov was fascinated by this and asked his patient to cry for his own "mommy" and "daddy".

However, Janov's primal therapy was the source of controversy, with allegations that Janov used the treatment as a "cash-grab scheme". In response, Janov stated that "We take no salaries and no profits and have not in years. We have paid several hundred thousand dollars for research to maintain our scientific integrity. We fund therapy for those who cannot afford it".

== Influence on popular music ==
Janov's patients included the musicians John Lennon and Yoko Ono. Janov's ideas had a significant impact on John Lennon/Plastic Ono Band, Lennon's first solo album after The Beatles, which centers themes of parental abandonment and psychological suffering and served to popularize primal scream therapy.

Two important bands formed in the early 1980s, Tears for Fears and Primal Scream, took their names from Janov's work. The influence on Tears for Fears is strongest on their first album The Hurting (including "Mad World" and "Ideas as Opiates," which is named for a chapter in Janov's Prisoners of Pain) and in their No. 1 single "Shout" from Songs from the Big Chair. The band eventually met Janov in 1986 and became disillusioned with him and his work.

== Personal life ==
Janov was first married to Vivian Glickstein in 1949, but they separated in 1975 and divorced in 1980 so that he could remarry. He married France Daunic four months later in 1980 and was still married to her at the time of his death. Janov had two children from his first marriage – Rick Janov, a primal therapist, and Ellen Janov, a singer and actress who died in 1976 – and an adopted son, Xavier, from his second marriage.

On October 1, 2017, Janov died in his sleep at the age of 93 of respiratory arrest complicated by a stroke. For several years, Janov suffered from a throat disease which limited his ability to speak. At the time of his death, he was living in Malibu, California.

== Works ==
- The Primal Scream (1970) ISBN 0-349-11829-9 - (revised 1999)
- The Anatomy of Mental Illness ISBN 978-0-4250364-2-6 (1971)
- The Primal Revolution: Toward a Real World (1972) ISBN 0-671-21641-4
- The Feeling Child (1973) ISBN 0-349-11832-9
- Primal Man: The new consciousness (1976) ISBN 0-690-01015-X
- Prisoners of Pain (1980) ISBN 0-385-15791-6
- Imprints: The Lifelong Effects of the Birth Experience (1984) ISBN 0-399-51086-9
- New Primal Scream: Primal Therapy 20 Years on (1992) ISBN 0-942103-23-8
- Why You Get Sick, How You Get Well: The Healing Power of Feelings (1996) ISBN 0-7871-0685-2
- The Biology of Love (2000) ISBN 1-57392-829-1
- Sexualité et subconscient : Perversions et déviances de la libido (2006) ISBN 2-268-05720-8
- Primal Healing: Access the Incredible Power of Feelings to Improve Your Health (2006) ISBN 1-56414-916-1
- The Janov Solution: Lifting Depression Through Primal Therapy (2007) ISBN 1-58501-111-8
- Life Before Birth: The Hidden Script That Rules Our Lives (2011) ISBN 978-0-9836396-0-2
- Beyond Belief: Cults, Healers, Mystics and Gurus – Why We Believe (2016) ISBN 978-0986203176

== Janov in media ==
- The Inner Revolution (1971 / 85 min) A personal account of primal therapy by Gil Toff.
- Primal Therapy: In Search of the Real You (1976 / 19 min)) A Canadian documentary.
- Primalterapi: vintern 1977 (1978 / 130 min) A Swedish 3-part documentary by Gerard Röhl.
- Arthur Janov's Primal Therapy (2018 / 45 min) An associative view by Ulf Kjell Gür.
