= Wilhelm scream =

Widely used sound effect

Audio sample of the Wilhelm scream

Complete recording session of the Wilhelm scream titled "Man getting bit by an alligator, and he screams"

The Wilhelm scream is an iconic stock sound effect that has been used in many films, television programs and other media, originating in the 1951 film Distant Drums, where the scream was allegedly voiced by actor Sheb Wooley. The scream is often used in scenarios when someone is shot, falls from a great height or is thrown from an explosion. The scream is named after Private Wilhelm, a character in The Charge at Feather River, a 1953 Western in which the character gets shot in the thigh with an arrow. This was its first use following its inclusion in the Warner Bros. Pictures stock sound library, although The Charge at Feather River was the third film to use the effect. It was used in all of the Star Wars and Indiana Jones films prior to Disney's acquisition of Lucasfilm.

== History ==
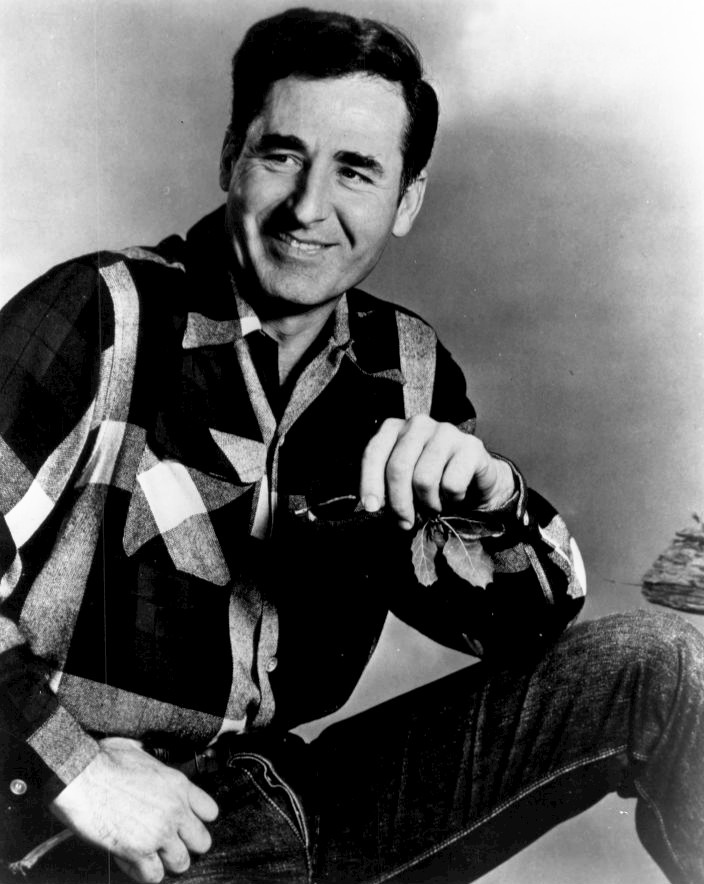
The probable voice of the scream, Sheb Wooley

The Wilhelm scream originates from a series of sound effects recorded for the 1951 film Distant Drums. In a scene from the film, soldiers fleeing a Seminole group are wading through a swamp in the Everglades, and one of them is bitten and dragged underwater by an alligator. The screams for that scene, and other scenes in the movie, were recorded later in a single take. The recording was titled "Man getting bit by an alligator, and he screams." The fifth take of the scream was used for the soldier in the alligator scene. Although it has been used three other times before in Distant Drums with the fourth, fifth and sixth take going in that order. Early on in the movie, the soldiers from the swamp scene initiate a nighttime raid on an old fort being used as a base for a group of Native Americans. And eventually a gunfight ensues then that led to the Wilhelm scream being used three times making the swamp scene the fourth use of The Wilhelm scream. The fourth take would later become known as the "Wilhelm scream". It is thought to have been voiced by actor Sheb Wooley (who also played the uncredited role of Pvt. Jessup in Distant Drums).

Because the costs of creating sound effects were high at that time, the scream was reused in a number of other Warner Bros. films in that era. Other films using the scream include Springfield Rifle (1952), The Charge at Feather River (1953), A Star Is Born (1954), Them! (1954), Land of the Pharaohs (1955), The Sea Chase (1955), Sergeant Rutledge (1960), PT 109 (1963), The Green Berets (1968), and The Wild Bunch (1969).

The Wilhelm scream became iconic in popular culture when motion picture sound designer Ben Burtt, who had come across the original recording on a studio archive sound reel, incorporated it into the scene in Star Wars (1977) in which Luke Skywalker shoots a Stormtrooper off a ledge. The effect is heard as the Stormtrooper is falling. Burtt named the scream after Pvt. Wilhelm, a minor character from The Charge at Feather River who appears to emit the scream, and adopted it as his personal sound signature. Burtt also found use for the effect in More American Graffiti (1979); and over the next decades he incorporated it into other films that he worked on, such as Willow (1988), Gremlins, Anchorman, Die Hard with a Vengeance, Lethal Weapon 4, The Fifth Element, and several George Lucas and Steven Spielberg films. Notably, the rest of the Star Wars films made under Lucas and all the Indiana Jones movies included the effect. (Note: It was announced in February 2018 that the Star Wars franchise would no longer use the Wilhelm scream, with The Force Awakens (2015) being the last film in the series to use it.)

Following its use in Star Wars, other sound designers have picked up and used the sound effect in works. Inclusion of the sound in films became a tradition among a certain community of sound designers. The National Science and Media Museum said that the Wilhelm scream had been used in more than 400 films.

The entire collection of original sources of the sound effects made by Sunset Editorial, which includes the Wilhelm scream, was donated to the USC School of Cinematic Arts in 1990. In 2023, Craig Smith released a copy of the complete recording from the original session on Freesound on behalf of the USC under the CC0 license, along with the rest of Sunset Editorial sound effects. On May 20, 2023, the entire collection of Sunset Editorial SFX was mirrored in the Internet Archive (also under the CC0 license) for the purpose of enabling a wider distribution, especially thanks to its BitTorrent support.

=== Voice of the scream ===
There is no definitive information identifying the original performer of the scream. However, research by Ben Burtt suggested that Sheb Wooley, best known for his 1958 novelty song "The Purple People Eater" and his character of American Indian scout Pete Nolan on the television series Rawhide, is likely to have been the voice actor who originally performed the scream. Wooley's widow, Linda Dotson, supported the view that it was Wooley's voice in a 2005 interview. Burtt discovered records at Warner Bros. from the editor of Distant Drums, including a short list of names of actors scheduled to record lines of dialogue for miscellaneous roles in the movie. Wooley was one of a few actors assembled for the recording of additional "pick-up" vocal elements for the film. Dotson confirmed Wooley's scream had been in many Westerns, adding that he "always used to joke about how he was so great about screaming and dying in films".

== See also ==
- List of filmmakers' signatures
