= Eskimo ice cream =

Eskimo ice cream may refer to:

- Alaskan ice cream (akutaq), a traditional food of Alaskan Eskimo, Yupik, Aleut
- Eskimo (ice cream), a chain of ice cream parlours in Nicaragua
- Edy's Pie, (formerly known as Eskimo pie) brand of chocolate-covered vanilla ice cream bar

== See also ==
- Indian ice cream (disambiguation)
- Ice cream (disambiguation)
- Eskimo (disambiguation)
