= Scream =

Scream may refer to:

- Screaming, a loud vocalization

== Amusement rides ==
- Scream (Heide Park), a gyro drop tower in Soltau, Germany
- Scream (Six Flags drop tower), at Six Flags Fiesta Texas and Six Flags New England
- Scream (roller coaster), at Six Flags Magic Mountain in California

== Arts, entertainment, and media ==
=== Comics ===
- Scream (character), a fictional character in the Spider-Man comic book series
- Angar the Screamer or Scream, a fictional character in the Marvel Comics universe
- Scream! (comics), a British horror comic

=== Films and television ===
- Scream, a 1964 Greek noir film directed by Kostas Andritsos
- Scream (1981 film), a slasher film
- Scream (franchise), a series of American horror films
  - Scream (1996 film), the first of the series of horror films
  - Scream (TV series), a 2015 television adaptation of the film franchise
  - Scream (2022 film), the fifth installment of the film series
- Scream (TV channel), a Canadian cable TV channel (2001–2009)

=== Music ===
==== Albums ====
- Scream (Chad Wackerman album), 2000
- Scream (Chris Cornell album), 2009
- Scream (Michael Jackson album), 2017
- Scream (Melody Club album), 2006
- Scream (Ozzy Osbourne album), 2010
- Scream (Pretty Maids album), 1994
- Scream (Markus Schulz album), 2012
- Scream (Sarah Bettens album), 2005
- Scream (Tokio Hotel album), 2007
- Scream (Tony Martin album), 2005

==== Songs ====
- "Scream" (2NE1 song), 2012
- "Scream" (Avenged Sevenfold song), 2008
- "Scream" (Billy Idol song), 2005
- "Scream" (Chris Cornell song), 2008
- "Scream" (Dizzee Rascal song), 2012
- "Scream" (Kelis song), 2010
- "Scream" (Michael Jackson and Janet Jackson song), 1995
- "Scream!" (Misfits song), 1999
- "Scream" (Sergey Lazarev song), a 2019 song that represented Russia in the Eurovision Song Contest
- "Scream" (Timbaland song), 2007
- "Scream" (Tiësto and John Christian song), 2017
- "Scream" (Tokio Hotel song), 2005
- "Scream" (Usher song), 2012
- "Scream", by Adelitas Way from their self-titled album
- "Scream", by Against the Current from Past Lives
- "Scream", by Artful Dodger
- "Scream", by Beach Bunny from Emotional Creature
- "Scream", by Benedictum from Obey
- "Scream", by Black Flag from My War
- "Scream", by CeeLo Green featured in Despicable Me 2
- "Scream", by Collective Soul from Hints Allegations and Things Left Unsaid
- "Scream", by Dio from Killing the Dragon
- "Scream", by Dreamcatcher
- "Scream", by Enhypen from Memorabilia
- "Scream", by Grimes from Art Angels
- "Scream", by Halestorm from Into the Wild Life
- "Scream", from the High School Musical 3: Senior Year film soundtrack
- "Scream", by Ima Robot from Ima Robot
- "Scream", by In Flames from Come Clarity
- "Scream", by Monrose, a B-side of the single "Hot Summer"
- "Scream", by Norther from Till Death Unites Us
- "Scream", by Primal Fear from Domination
- "Scream", by Sharon Needles from Taxidermy
- "Scream", by Slipknot from Vol. 3: (The Subliminal Verses)
- "Scream", by TVXQ from Tree
- "Screaming", by Band-Maid, a B-side of the single "Start Over"
- "Screaming", by Bronski Beat from The Age of Consent
- "Screaming", by Loathe from I Let It In and It Took Everything

==== Other uses in music ====
- Scream (band), an American punk band
- Scream (EP), by Tokoyami Towa, 2022
- Screaming (music), a form of singing
- ScreaM Records, the EDM imprint of South Korean record label SM Entertainment

=== Other uses in arts, entertainment, and media ===
- Scream (horror magazine), a British bi-monthly horror magazine
- Scream Magazine (music magazine), a Norwegian hard rock and metal magazine
- Scream! (comics), a British weekly horror comic anthology
- The Scream, a painting by Edvard Munch
- Wilhelm scream, a film and television stock sound effect

== Brands and enterprises ==
- Scream (music club), in Los Angeles, California
- Scream Pubs, a pub chain in the UK

== Other uses ==
- Scream (cipher), a word-based stream cipher

== See also ==
- I Scream (disambiguation)
- Primal Scream (disambiguation)
- Screamer (disambiguation)
- Screamo, a music genre
- The Scream (disambiguation)
