= El grito =

El grito may refer to:

- El grito (film), a 1968 Mexican documentary film
- El grito (novel), a 2004 Argentine novel by Florencia Abbate

== See also ==
- Grito de Dolores, also known as the Cry of Dolores or El Grito de Independencia
- The Scream (disambiguation)
