= Eskimo (disambiguation) =

Eskimo (often considered a pejorative), is an exonym for the Inuit and Yupik indigenous peoples who have traditionally inhabited the northern circumpolar region from eastern Siberia (Russia), across Alaska (United States), Canada, and Greenland.

Eskimo may also refer to:

== Dogs ==
- American Eskimo Dog
- Canadian Eskimo Dog
- One of various breeds of huskies

== Food ==
- Eskimo (ice cream), a national Nicaraguan ice cream chain
- Eskimo, a brand of ice cream from Austria owned by Unilever.
- Eskimo Mints, a type of breath mint produced by Oatfield
- Edy's Pie a brand of ice cream confections in the USA formerly known as Eskimo Pie
- Eskimo (рус. Эскимо) is a general food industry term to name both Ice pop and Ice cream bar in Russia and mostly all Post-Soviet States

== Geography ==
- Eskimo Hill, a mountain in Alaska, U.S.
- Eskimo Pass, a pass on Baffin Island, Nunavut, Canada
- Eskimo Point, a promontory in Antarctica
- Arviat, a community in Nunavut, Canada, formerly called Eskimo Point
- Eskimo Point and Eskimo Island, located near Churchill, Manitoba, Canada

== Music ==
- Eskimo (album), a 1979 album by The Residents
- "Eskimo", a song by Corky and the Juice Pigs
- "Eskimo", a song by Damien Rice from his 2003 album O
- "Eskimo", a song by the Red Hot Chili Peppers, released as a b-side to "Fortune Faded"
- Eskimo (grime beat), an instrumental grime beat by MC Wiley
- Four Eskimo Pieces, Op. 64 (1907), solo piano works by Amy Beach
- Joyryde (born 1985), psytrance DJ and producer, also known as Eskimo

== Screen ==
- Eskimo (1930 film), a Norwegian film directed by George Schnéevoigt
- Eskimo (1933 film), an Oscar-winning film by Irving Thalberg

== Sports ==
- Abitibi Eskimos, a former name of the amateur ice hockey team the Timmins Rock
- Edmonton Eskimos, a former name of the Canadian Football League team the Edmonton Elks
- Duluth Eskimos, a former National Football league team

== Other ==
- Eskimo (appliances), a Greek domestic appliance company
- Eskimo curlew, a rare species of curlew
- Eskimo kiss, the act of pressing the tip of one's nose against another's nose.
- Eskimo Nebula, a cloud of gas 3000 light-years from earth
- Esky, an Australian term for a portable cooler
- Inuit kinship, a type of kinship system, formerly Eskimo kinship
- Paul Clark (poker player) (1947–2015), nicknamed Eskimo
- Esquimaux (HBC vessel), a Hudson's Bay Company vessel
- Eskimo (HBC vessel), a Hudson's Bay Company vessel

== See also ==
- Eskimo Joe (disambiguation)
- Gabby's World, a band formerly known as Eskimeaux
- Eskmo, an American electronic music producer and composer
- Ezkimo, a Finnish hip hop musician
- Esquimalt (disambiguation)
