= Indian ice cream =

Indian ice cream may refer to:

- Indian ice cream (Alaska) of Alaskan Athabaskans
- Indian ice cream (Canada) (or sxusem) of First Nations in British Columbia
- kulfi (or Indian ice cream) from Indian Subcontinent of Asia

== See also ==
- Eskimo (ice cream)
- Ice cream (disambiguation)
- Indian (disambiguation)
