= I Scream =

I Scream may refer to:

- "Ice Cream (I Scream, You Scream, We All Scream for Ice Cream)", a 1927 popular song
- I Scream (Nana Kitade album), 2006
- I Scream (Kis-My-Ft2 album), 2016
- I Scream (EP), a 1993 EP by Some Velvet Sidewalk
- iScream, a digital service launched by the British horror film magazine Scream
- I Scream Records, a record label based in Belgium
- iScreaM Vol. 1–12, remix projects by South Korean label ScreaM Records
- Iscream, a character in the American animated web series Chikn Nuggit

== See also ==
- "Ai Scream!", popular 2025 song by Japanese group AiScReam
- I Scream Ice Cream, a Danish electronic music band
- Ice cream
- Ice cream (disambiguation)
- Scream (disambiguation)
