= The Evil in Us =

- Directed by: Jason William Lee
- Written by: Jason William Lee
- Produced by: Dalj Brar
- Starring: Debs Howard; Danny Zaporozan; Behtash Faziali; Ian Collins; Marina Pasqua; Kylee Bush
- Cinematography: Cole Graham
- Edited by: Michael Gyori; Jason William Lee
- Music by: Sam Levin
- Production company: Sandcastle Pictures
- Release date: 19 August 2016 (UK)
- Running time: 90 minutes
- Country: Canada
- Language: English

The Evil in Us is a 2016 Canadian zombie horror film directed by Jason William Lee, starring Debs Howard, Danny Zaporozan, Behtash Faziali, Ian Collins, Marina Pasqua and Kylee Bush.

== Cast ==
- Debs Howard as Brie Armstrong
- Danny Zaporozan as Steve Ridley
- Behtash Faziali as Bash Gill
- Ian Collins as John Wheeler
- Marina Pasqua as Roxanne Bouchard
- Kylee Bush as Trish Walker
- Robert Leaf as Senator Elias Cob
- John Gillich as Detective Jake Strudwick
- Gary Starkell as Raymond Ford
- Jerome Velinsky as Detective Rick Evans
- Patrick Gaites as Roy Collins
- Tatyana Forrest as Zoe Kieslowska
- Becky Hachey as Dr. Amy Nichols
- Gabriel Carter as Officer Mitchell
- Dayleigh Nelson as Officer Drake

== Reception ==
Gareth Jones of Dread Central rated the film 3 stars out of 5 and wrote that the film "winds up being a solid, undemanding watch for fans of the genre."

Cleaver Patterson of Scream rated the film 3 stars out of 5 and wrote that while the film is "unlikely to bring much in the way of lasting life to the zombie movie sub-genre", as a "satirical take on the corruption of American politics and big business, coloured with a heavy dose of blood red horror, the result should get the popular vote amongst horror fans everywhere."

Film critic Kim Newman wrote that the film is mostly an "essay in the Cabin Fever cycle in which shallow, pretty folks tear into each other – their great faces, neato hair and trim bods are established lovingly early on, all the better to contrast with the way they look after they’ve had chunks bitten out of their faces, been set on fire, suffered scratching and clawing and generally abused themselves and each other."
