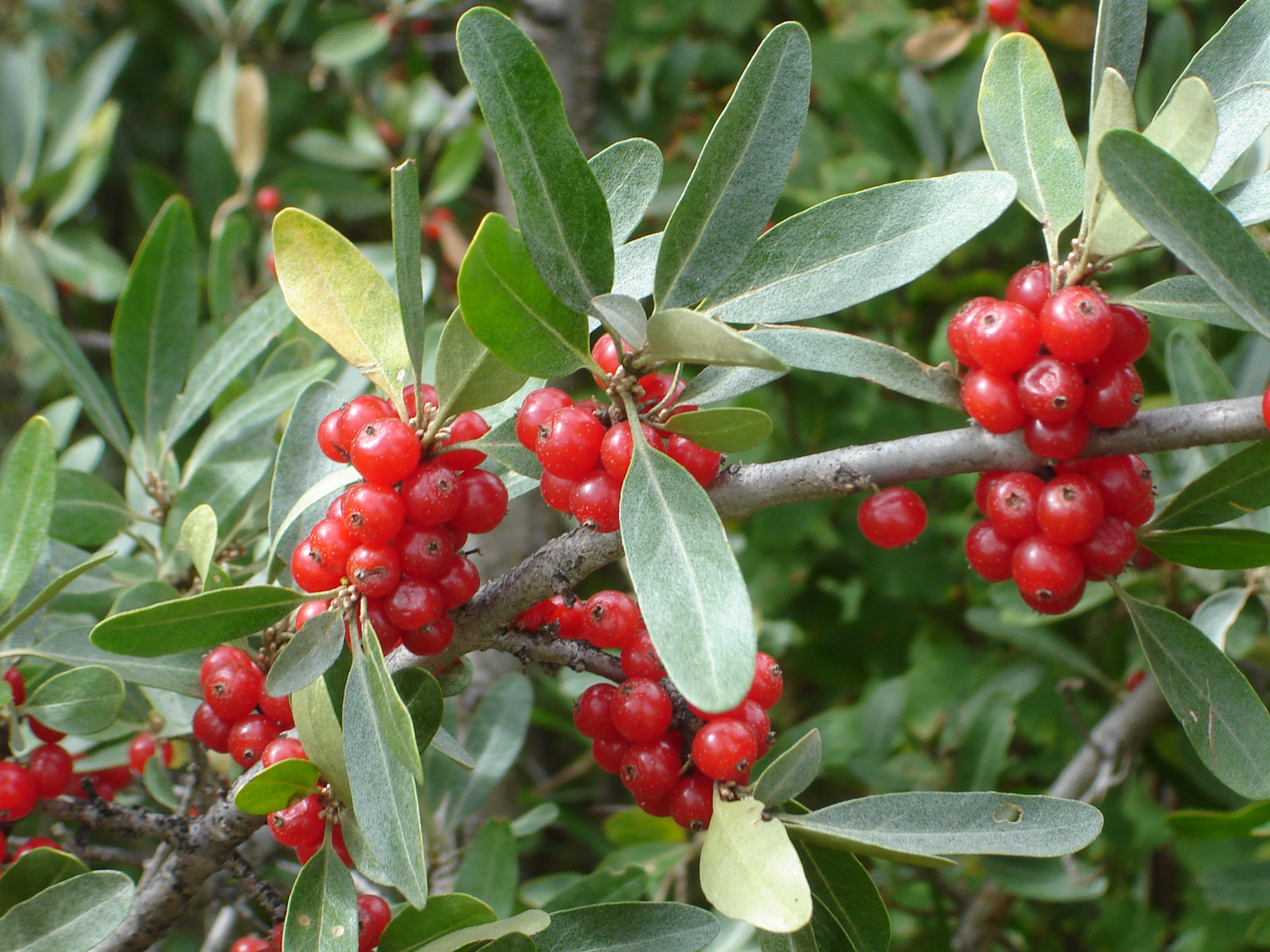

Conservation status
- Secure (NatureServe)

Scientific classification
- Kingdom: Plantae
- Clade: Tracheophytes
- Clade: Angiosperms
- Clade: Eudicots
- Clade: Rosids
- Order: Rosales
- Family: Elaeagnaceae
- Genus: Shepherdia
- Species: S. argentea

Binomial name
- Shepherdia argentea (Pursh) Nutt.
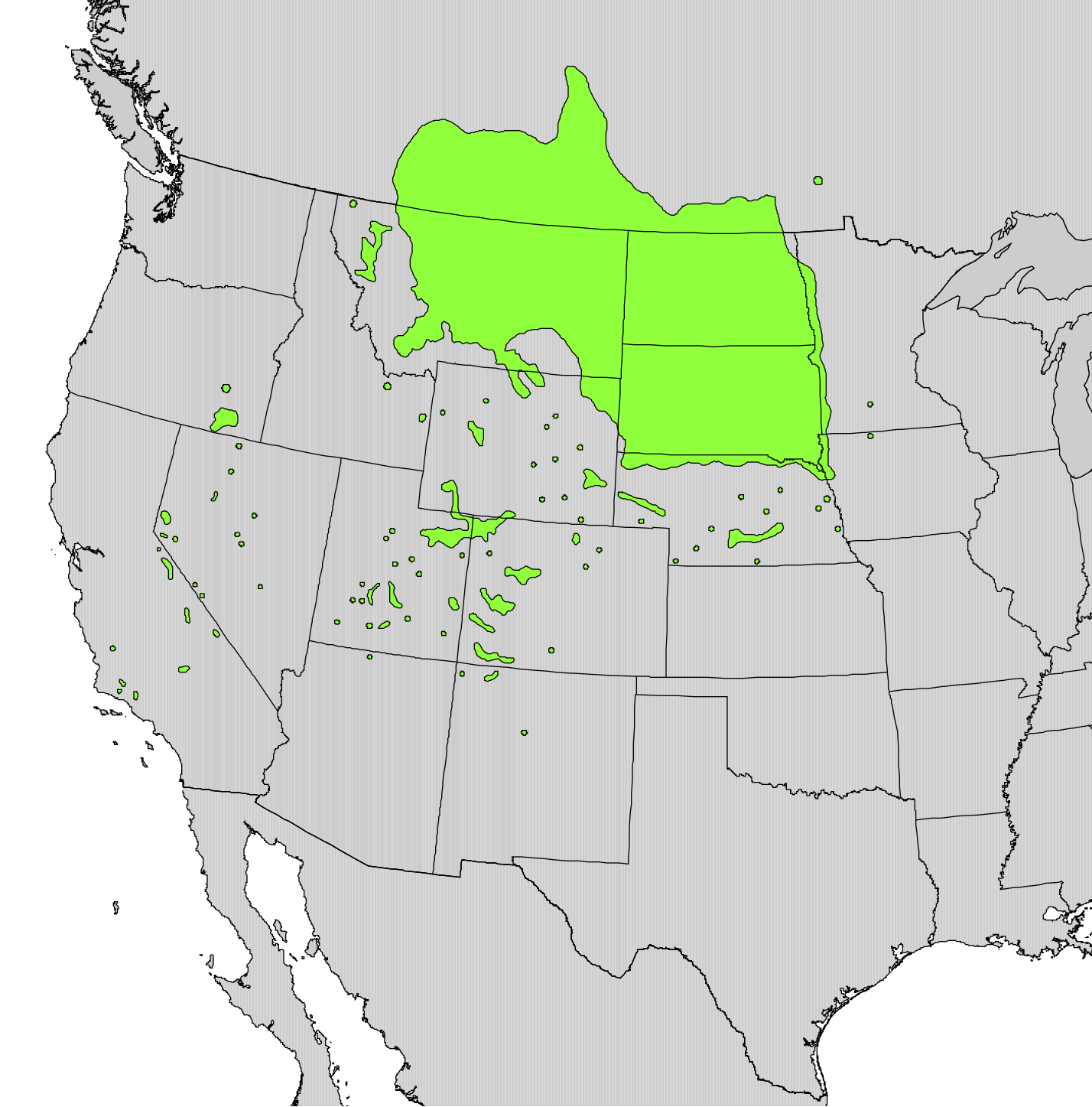

Synonyms
- Elaeagnus utilis A.Nelson (1935); Hippophae argentea Pursh (1813); Lepargyrea argentea (Pursh) Greene (1890)

= Shepherdia argentea =

Species of Shepherdia

Shepherdia argentea, commonly called silver buffaloberry, bull berry, or thorny buffaloberry, is a species of Shepherdia in the oleaster family. It is native to central and western North America.

== Description ==
Shepherdia argentea is a deciduous shrub growing from 2–6 metres (6 1/2–19 1/2 ft) tall. The leaves are arranged in opposite pairs (rarely alternately arranged), 2–6 centimetres (3/4–2 1/4 in) long, oval with a rounded apex, green with a covering of fine silvery, silky hairs, more thickly silvery below than above.

The flowers are pale yellow, with four sepals but no petals.

The fruit is a bright red fleshy drupe 5 mm in diameter; it is edible but with a rather bitter taste. Two cultivars, 'Xanthocarpa' and 'Goldeneye', form yellow fruit.

== Taxonomy ==
The Latin specific epithet argentea refers to the silver color of the plant's leaves and stems.

== Distribution and habitat ==
Shepherdia argentea is native to the western and central parts of Canada and North America, from the Prairie Provinces of Canada (Alberta, Saskatchewan, Manitoba) southwards in the United States as far as Ventura County in California, as well as northern Arizona, and northwestern New Mexico.

It grows in many different kinds of habitats such as riparian areas, woodlands, exposed slopes on prairies, and in dry, sandy soils of plains and canyons.

== Ecology ==
The berry is one of the mainstays of the diet of the sharp-tailed grouse, the provincial bird of Saskatchewan. The foliage provides important forage for mule deer and white-tailed deer. The shrub's thorny branches and thicket forming habit provide a shelter for many small animal species and an ideal nesting site for songbirds. Over the extent of its range, the buffaloberry is an important species in a variety of ecological communities. For example, in the shrub-grassland communities of North Dakota it is found growing with many native grasses, while in riparian woodlands of Montana and Western North Dakota it can be found in plant communities dominated by green ash.

== Uses ==
Like the Canada buffaloberry, S. argentea has been used historically as a food, medicine, and dye. Its various uses including the treatment of stomach troubles and in coming-of-age ceremonies for girls.

In the Great Basin, the berries were eaten raw and dried for winter use, but more often cooked into a flavoring sauce for bison meat. The buffaloberry has been a staple food to some Native Americans, who ate the berries in puddings, jellies, and in raw or dried form.

The Gosiute Shoshone name for the plant is añ-ka-mo-do-nûp.
