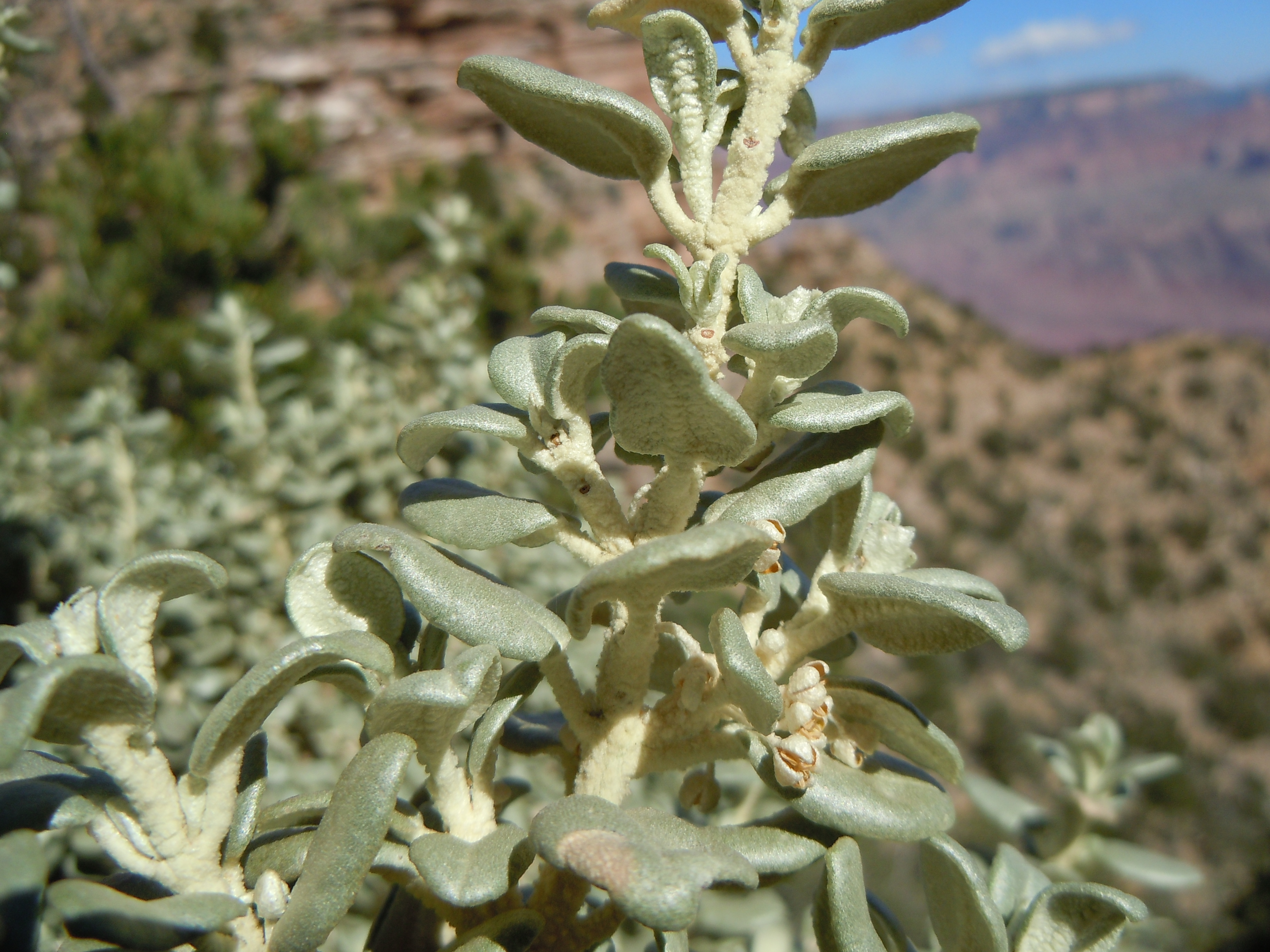
- Roundleaf buffaloberry with flowerbuds in Grand Canyon National Park

Conservation status
- Vulnerable (NatureServe)

Scientific classification
- Kingdom: Plantae
- Clade: Tracheophytes
- Clade: Angiosperms
- Clade: Eudicots
- Clade: Rosids
- Order: Rosales
- Family: Elaeagnaceae
- Genus: Shepherdia
- Species: S. rotundifolia

Binomial name
- Shepherdia rotundifolia Parry

= Shepherdia rotundifolia =

Roundleaf buffaloberry

Species of shrub

Shepherdia rotundifolia, the roundleaf buffaloberry or silverleaf, is a 3-to-6-foot (1-to-2-meter) evergreen shrub in the oleaster family (Elaeagnaceae) that grows only in the Colorado Plateau (endemic) of the southwestern United States. The common name comes from western settlers using the cooked berries in a sauce for eating cooked buffalo meat.

== Leaves and stems ==
"Rotundifolia" is for the oval or egg-shaped leaves, which can vary to being lance shaped. They are 1/4 to 1 1/2 inches (6 to 38 mm) long, silvery green on top (hence the other common name), and hairy and pale on the bottom.

== Inflorescence and fruit ==
Flowers open from May to June and are yellowish. They are produced singly or in a cluster from leaf axils.

Fruits are elliptical, with star-shaped hairs.

== Habitat and range ==
It grows in mixed desert shrub, pinyon juniper woodland, and ponderosa pine forest communities as high as 7,800 feet (2,400 m) elevations.
