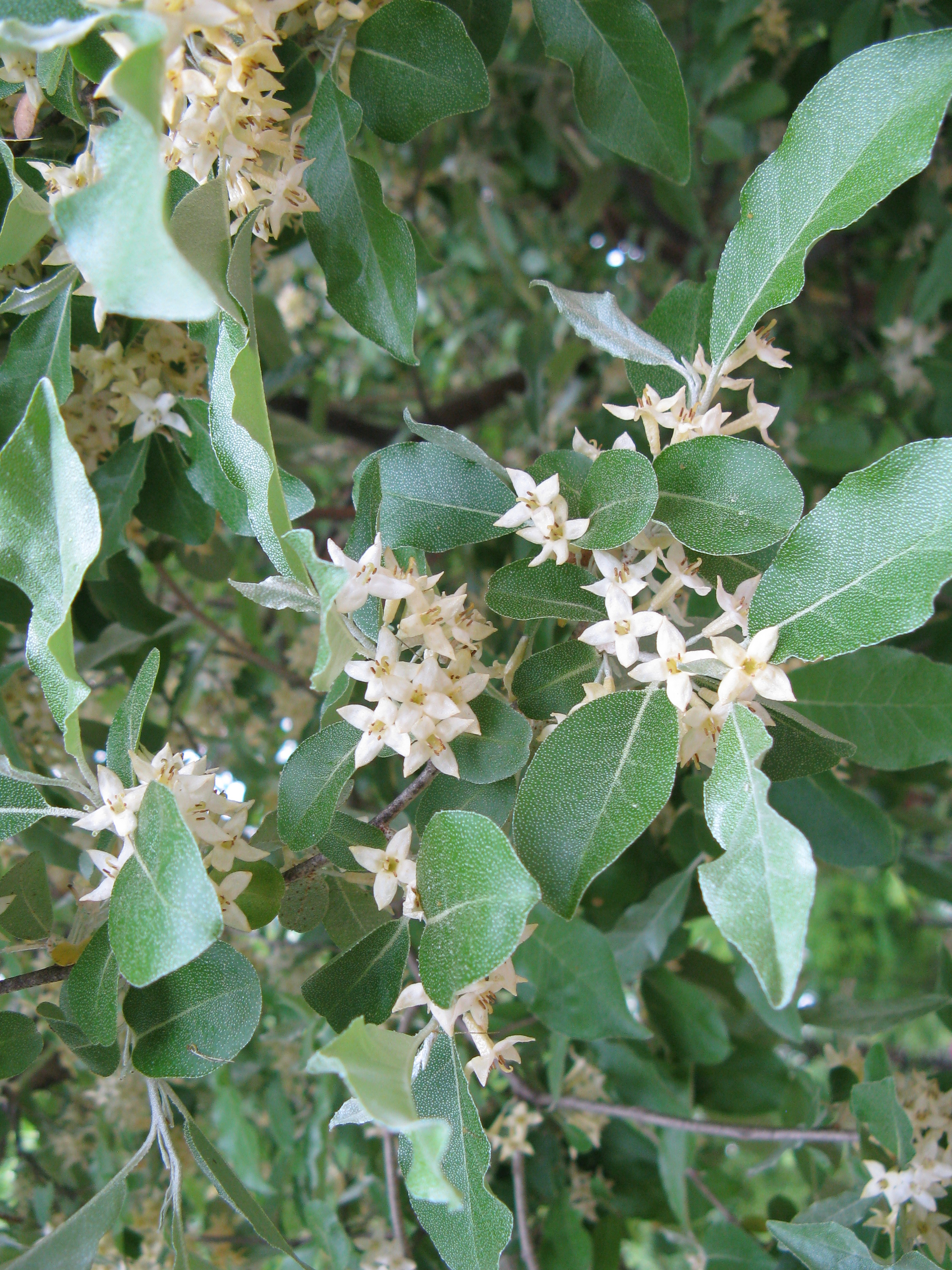

Conservation status
- Least Concern (IUCN 3.1)

Scientific classification
- Kingdom: Plantae
- Clade: Tracheophytes
- Clade: Angiosperms
- Clade: Eudicots
- Clade: Rosids
- Order: Rosales
- Family: Elaeagnaceae
- Genus: Elaeagnus
- Species: E. umbellata

Binomial name
- Elaeagnus umbellata Thunb.

= Elaeagnus umbellata =

Species of flowering plant

Elaeagnus umbellata is a species of flowering plant known as Japanese silverberry, umbellata oleaster, autumn olive, autumn elaeagnus, spreading oleaster, autumnberry, or autumn berry. The species is indigenous to eastern Asia and ranges from the Himalayas eastwards to Japan. It is a hardy, aggressive invasive species able to readily colonize barren land, becoming invasive in the central and northeastern United States and parts of Europe.

== Description ==
=== Vegetative characteristics ===
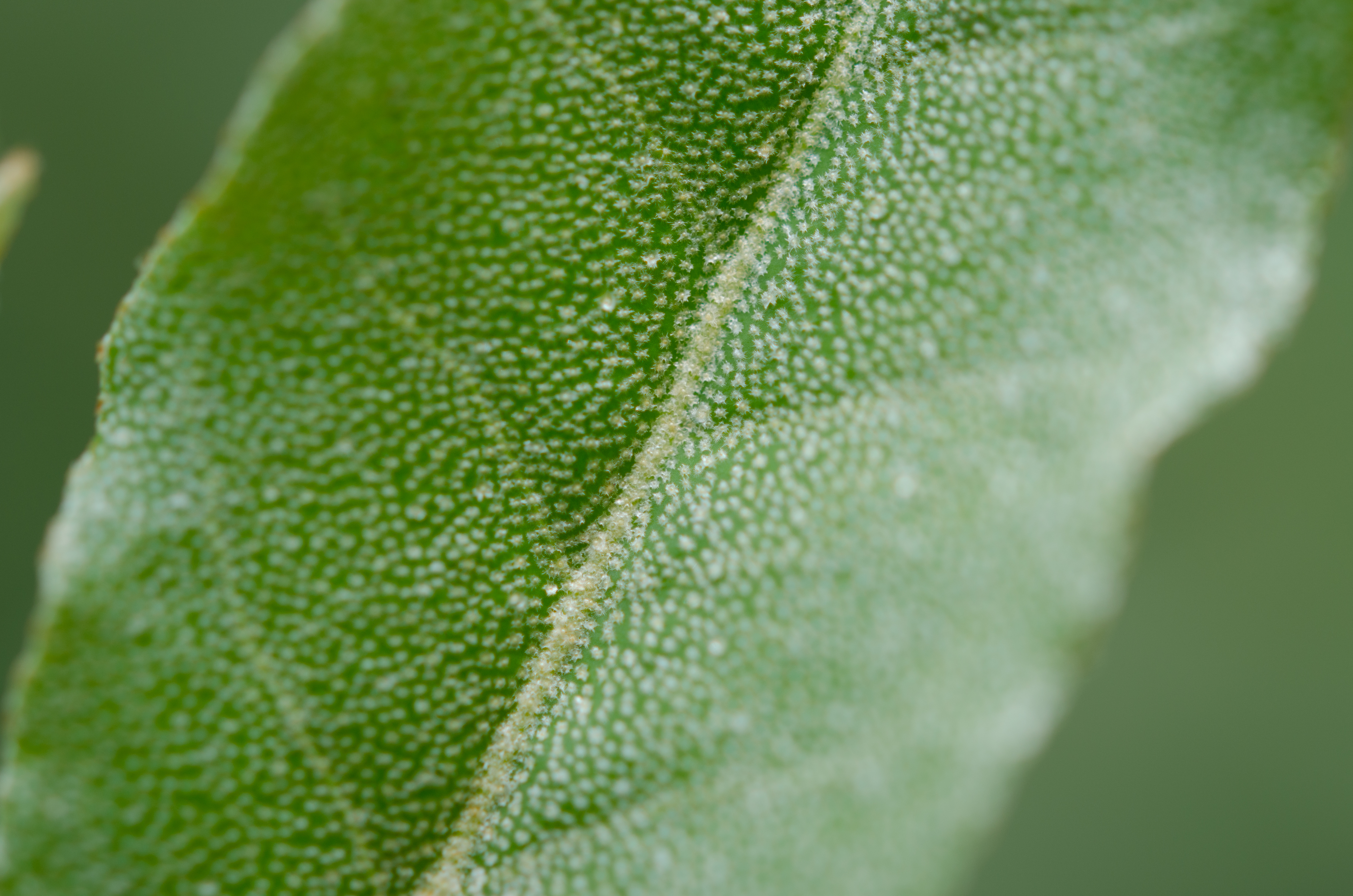
Dorsal side of leaf

Microscopic image of leaf cross-section

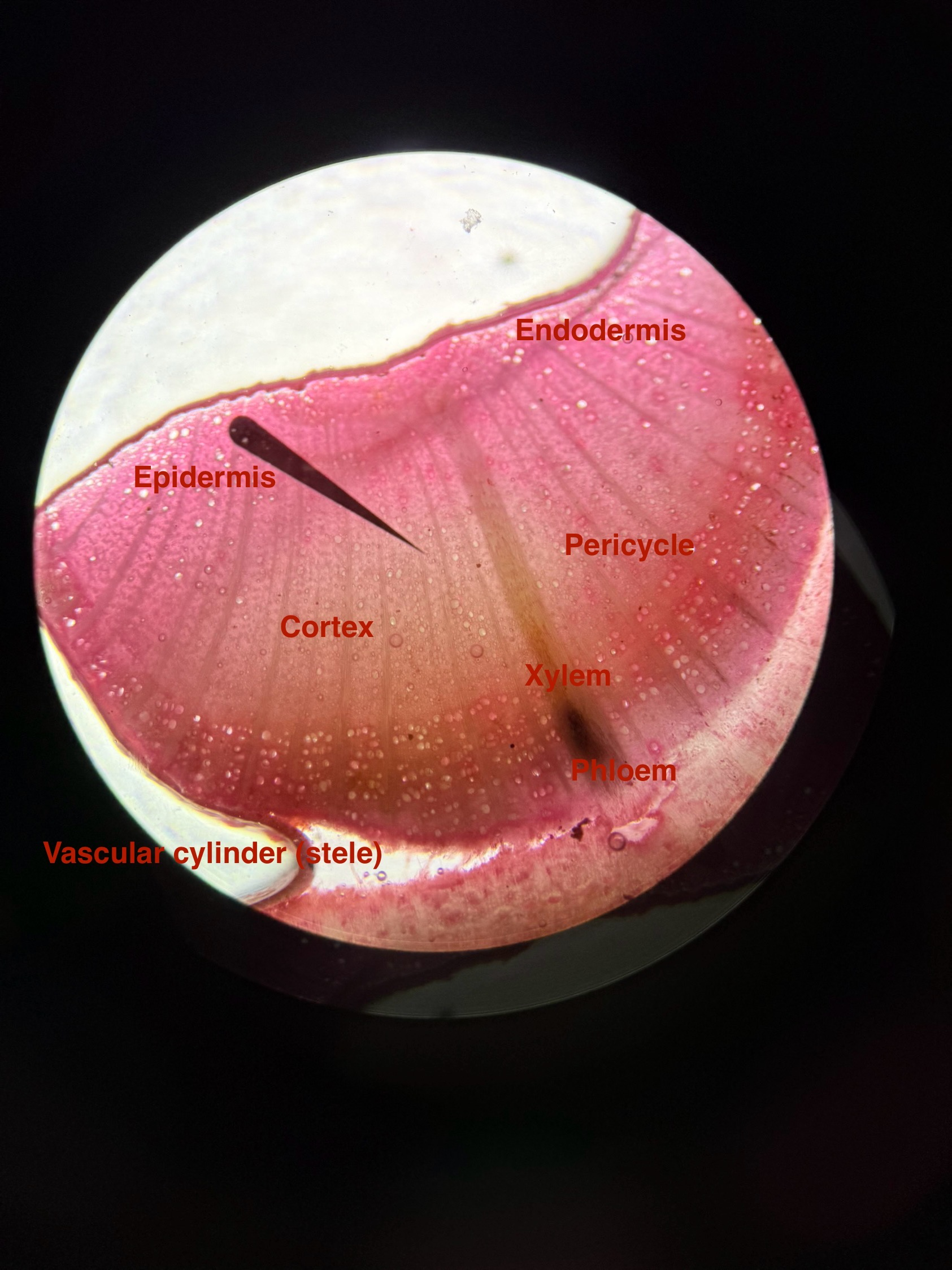
Cross-section of the stem, showing the outermost layer of cells

Elaeagnus umbellata is an up to 3.5 metres (11 ft) tall, deciduous shrub or small tree with a dense crown. It bears sharp thorns. The alternate, 4–10 cm (1.6–3.9 in) long, and 2–4 cm (0.79–1.57 in) wide leaves have wavy margins. They are covered with minute silvery scales when they emerge early in the spring but turn greener above as the scales wear off during the summer. The underside is more intensely covered in the silvery scales, differing from the related E. angustifolia, which remains silvery until it sheds its leaves in the fall. The leaves have a prominent central vein with branching lateral veins. The epidermis is made of a single layer of cells.

=== Generative characteristics ===
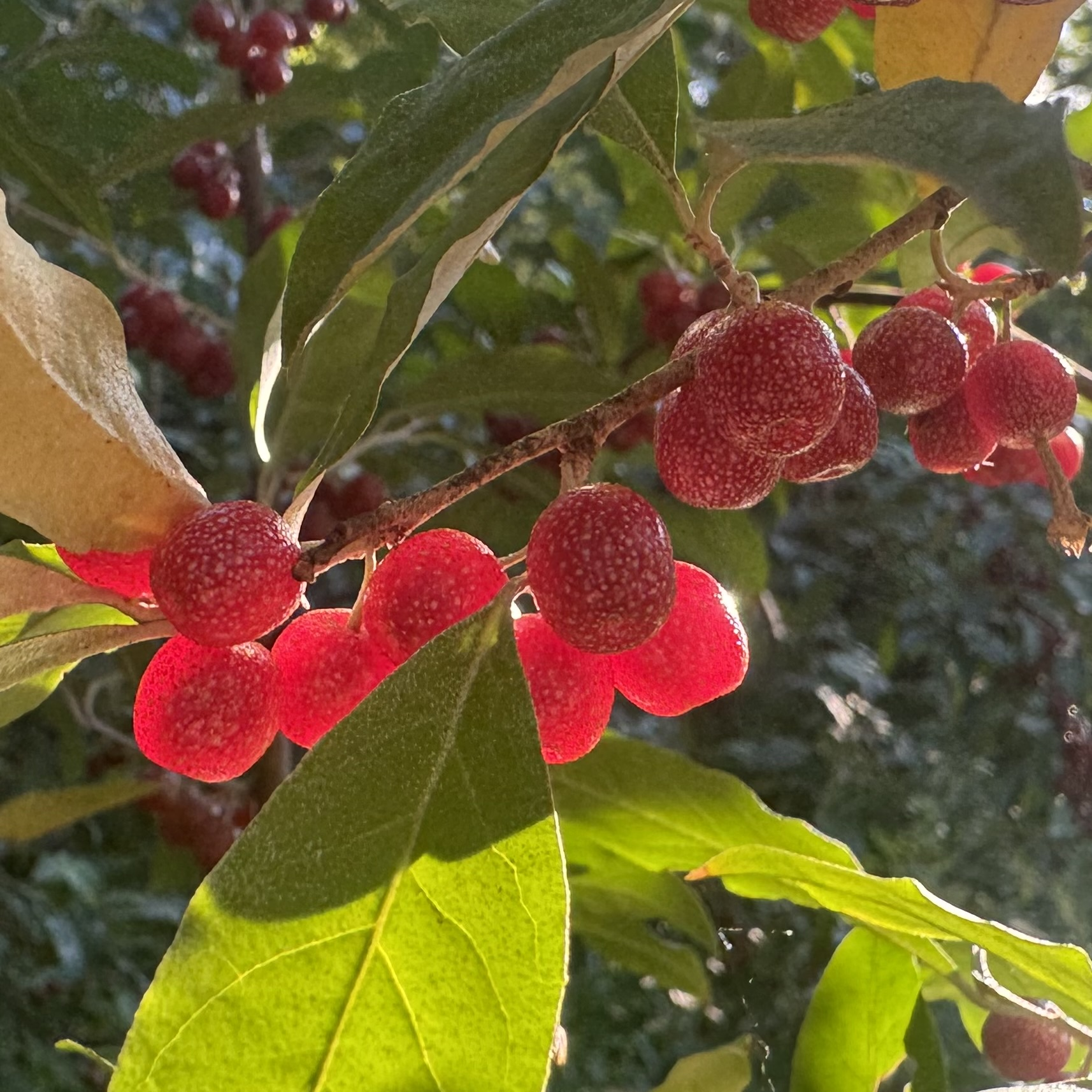
The fruit of a Japanese silverberry plant

Flowers are fragrant, occur in clusters of white to yellow, are 8–9 mm in length and 7 mm in diameter, and have four lobes. They are an important source of nectar for pollinators such as bees. The fruit is a small round drupe 0.65 to 0.85 centimetres (1/4 to 3/8 in) in diameter. The unripe fruit is silvery-scaled and yellow. It ripens to red, dotted with silver or brown. The ripe fruits are pulpy, juicy and sweet, 3–9 mm in length, 5 mm in diameter, and average 137 milligrams in weight, with a thin skin covering the whole fruit. When mature, the red berries contain carotenoids, including considerable amounts of lycopene.

== Distribution and habitat ==
In its origin regions of tropical and temperate Asia, E. umbellata is not considered to be an invasive species, but in many world regions, it has become invasive across wild and cultivated areas, particularly in the eastern United States. In the early 19th century, E. umbellata was purposely introduced to the U.S. and the United Kingdom for shelter belts, erosion control, wasteland reclamation, wildlife habitat, and for gardens as an ornamental. By the late 20th century, the shrub became a noxious weed and invasive species in many U.S. states from the east coast to the central prairies, and spread widely across Europe. Due to its substantial seed production and avid germination potential, E. umbellata rapidly invades new areas where it can resprout readily after burning or cutting. Because E. umbellata stands are habitats for wildlife, such as providing forage and shelter for deer, nesting sites for birds, and berries as food for several species, it has been planted for wildlife management in parts of the U.S.

In Europe, E. umbellata has spread to the UK, Belgium, France, and Italy, but has been cultivated in the Netherlands and Scotland. In some parts of North America where it has become naturalized, E. umbellata is considered a noxious weed, particularly in the central and northeastern U.S. In Canada, it is a "prohibited noxious weed" under the Alberta Weed Control Act 2010.

Because it fixes atmospheric nitrogen in its roots, E. umbellata may grow vigorously and sometimes competitively in infertile soils. It can increase available nitrogen in soils and benefit some nearby plants, and when grown in orchards, it can increase yields of adjacent fruit trees up to 10%. However, its ability to change soil chemistry can severely alter or destroy native plant communities.

== Uses ==
The fruit with its sweet and tart flavor can be eaten fresh or processed for jam, condiments, flavoring, or used as a substitute for tomato.

== Cultivated varieties ==
- Charlies Golden - yellow fruits variety
- Ruby
- Elsberry
- Brilliant Rose
- Cardinal - American variety, selected 1963.d
- Jewel
- Delightful
- Sweet and Tart
- Redwing
- Amber – yellow fruits, old Japanese variety
- Turdus – German variety, on market since 1992.
- Serinus – German variety, on market since 1992.
- Marzahne – German variety
- Sweet Milan - Polish variety
- Red Milan - Polish variety
- Powsin - Polish variety
- K2 - Polish variety

== Gallery ==
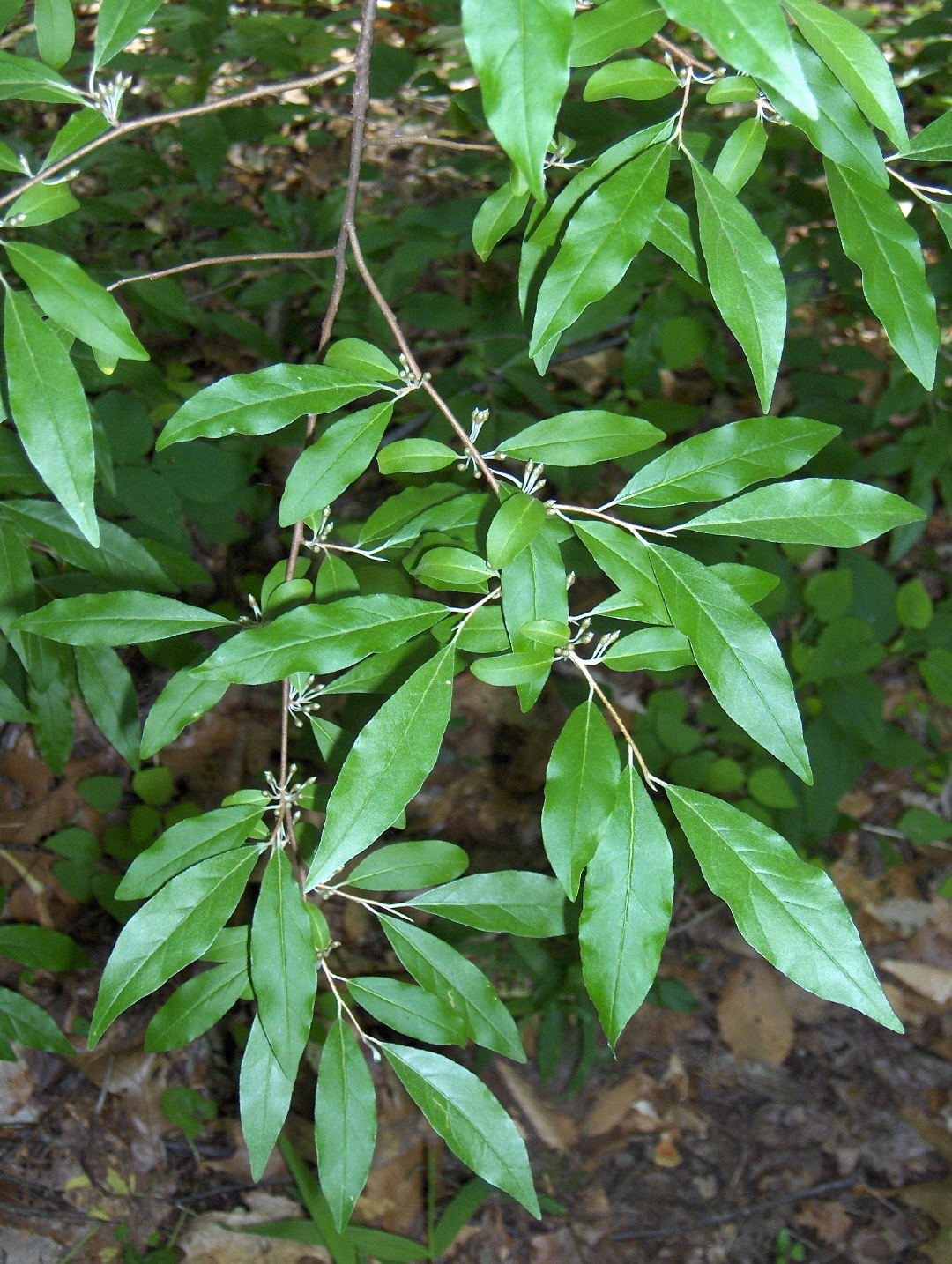
Leaves

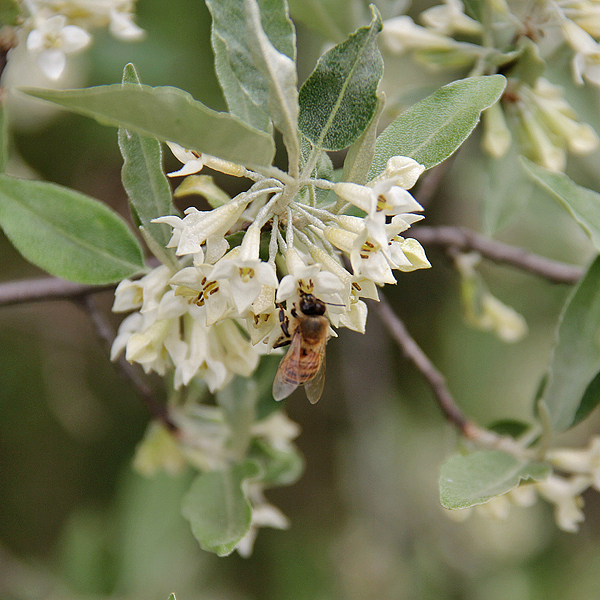
Blossoms

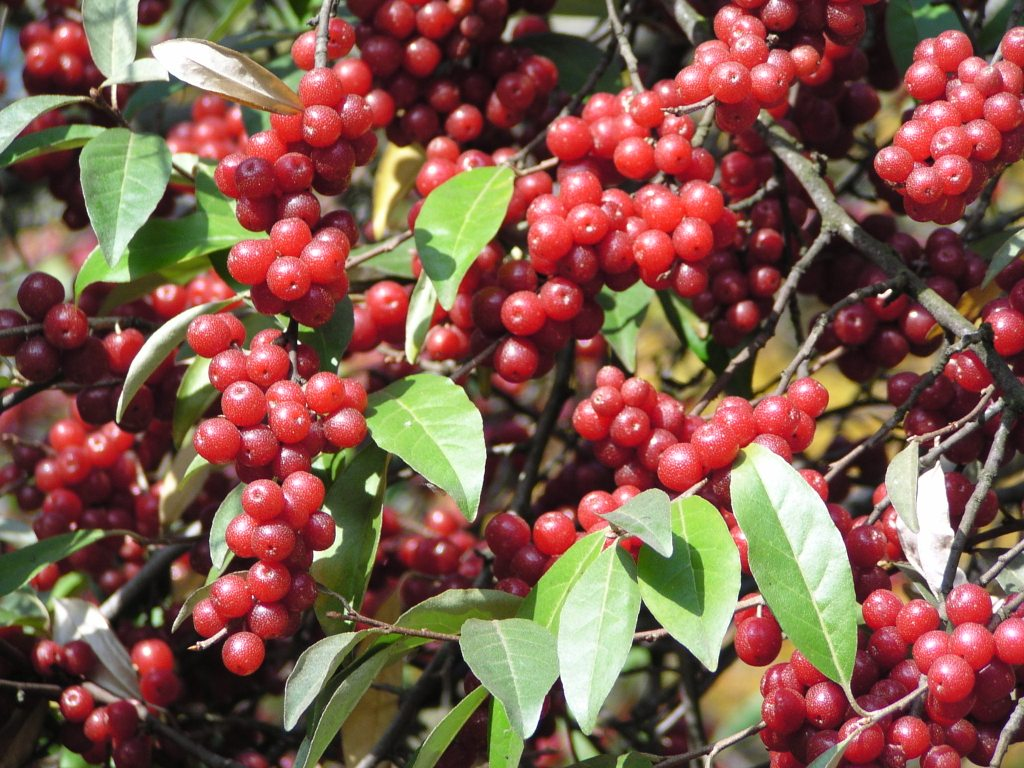
Ripe fruit
