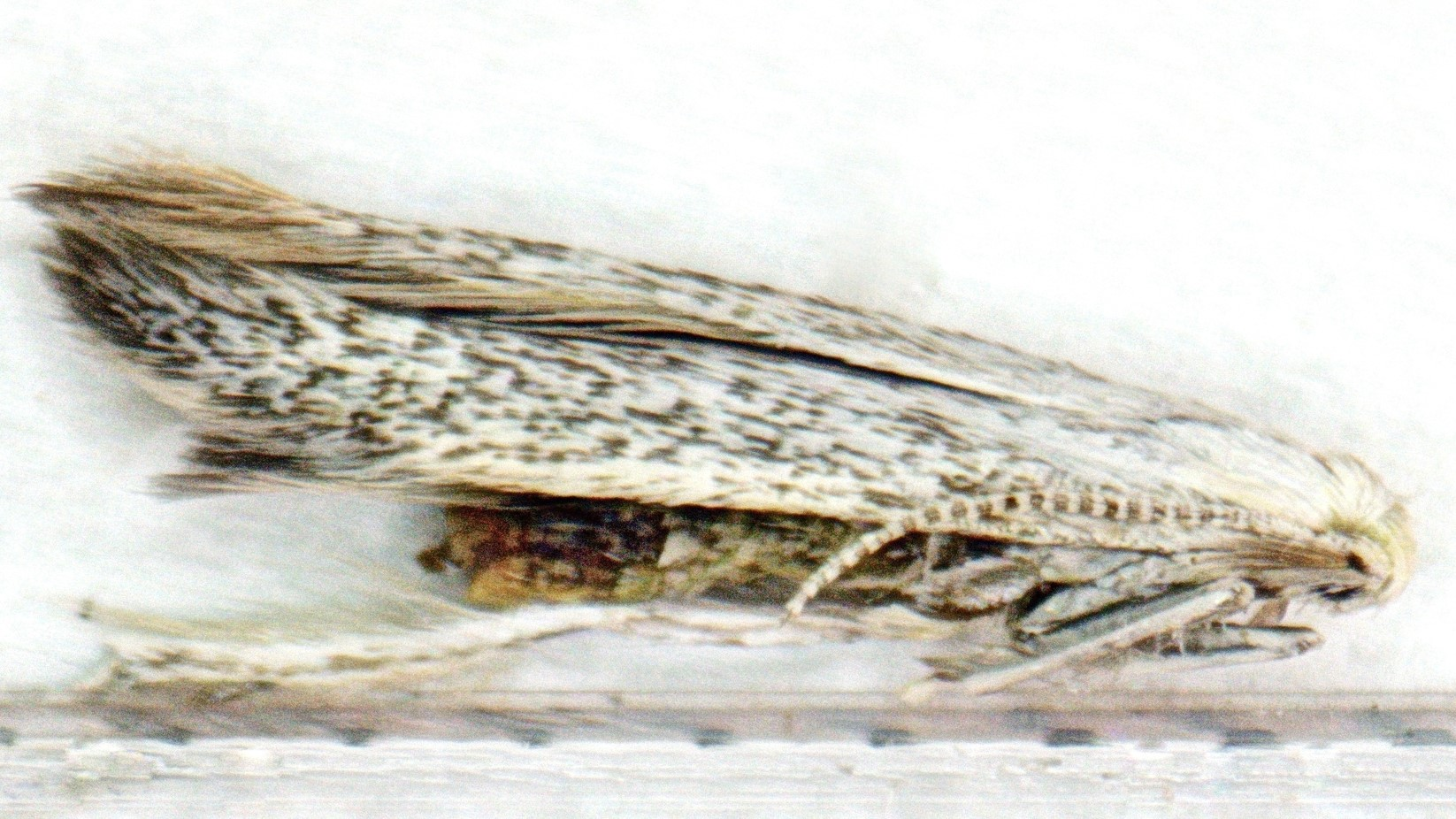

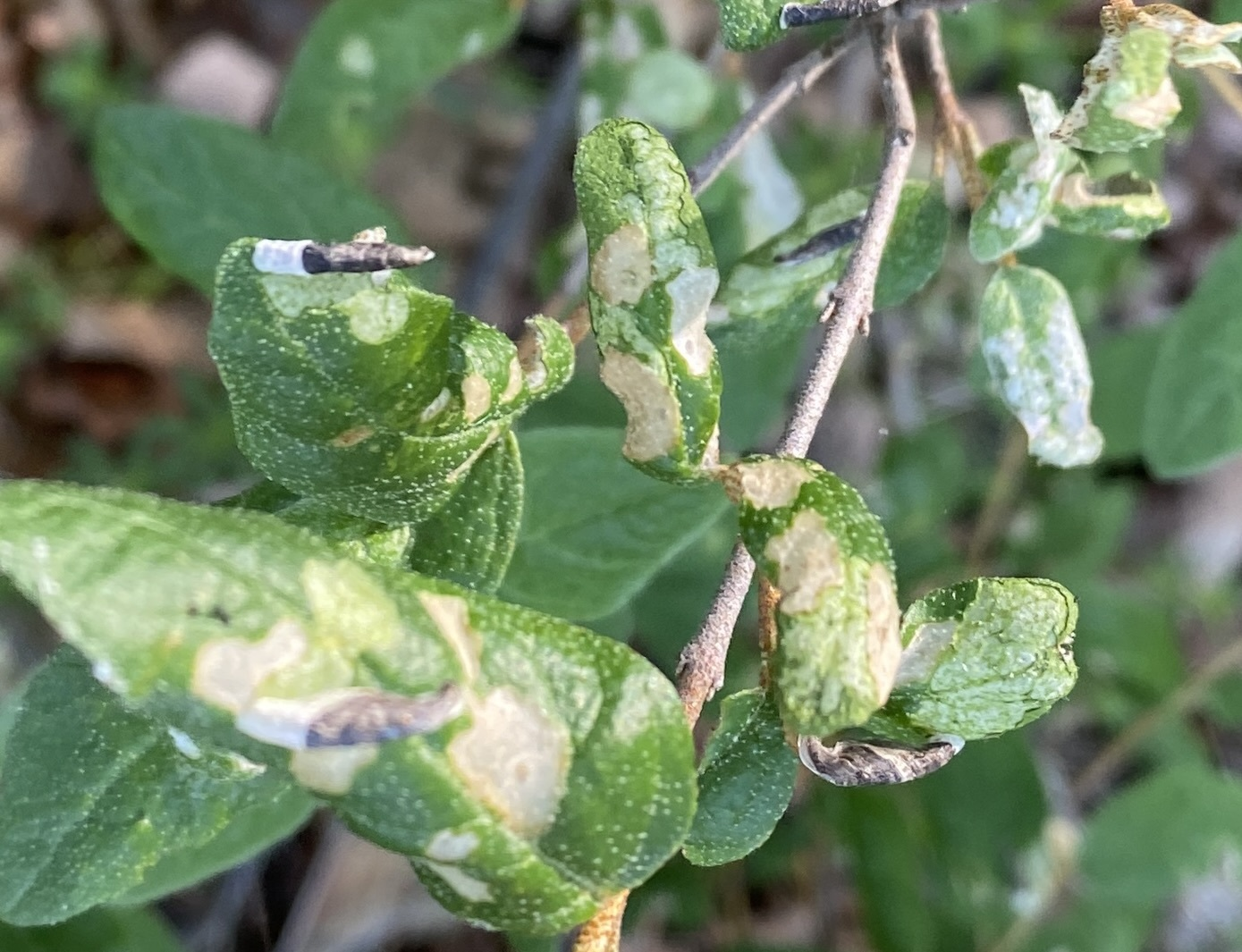
- Adult (top) and leaf damage (bottom)

Scientific classification
- Kingdom: Animalia
- Phylum: Arthropoda
- Class: Insecta
- Order: Lepidoptera
- Family: Coleophoridae
- Genus: Coleophora
- Species: C. elaeagnisella

Binomial name
- Coleophora elaeagnisella Kearfott, 1908

= Coleophora elaeagnisella =

Species of moth

The speckled casebearer moth (Coleophora elaeagnisella) is a species of moth in the family Coleophoridae. It is found in North America, from the Great Lakes northward, including Michigan and Ontario.

The larvae feed on the leaves of Elaeagnus, Hippophae and Shepherdia species. They create a pistol-shaped case.
