= Florencia Abbate =

Argentine writer, poet, and journalist

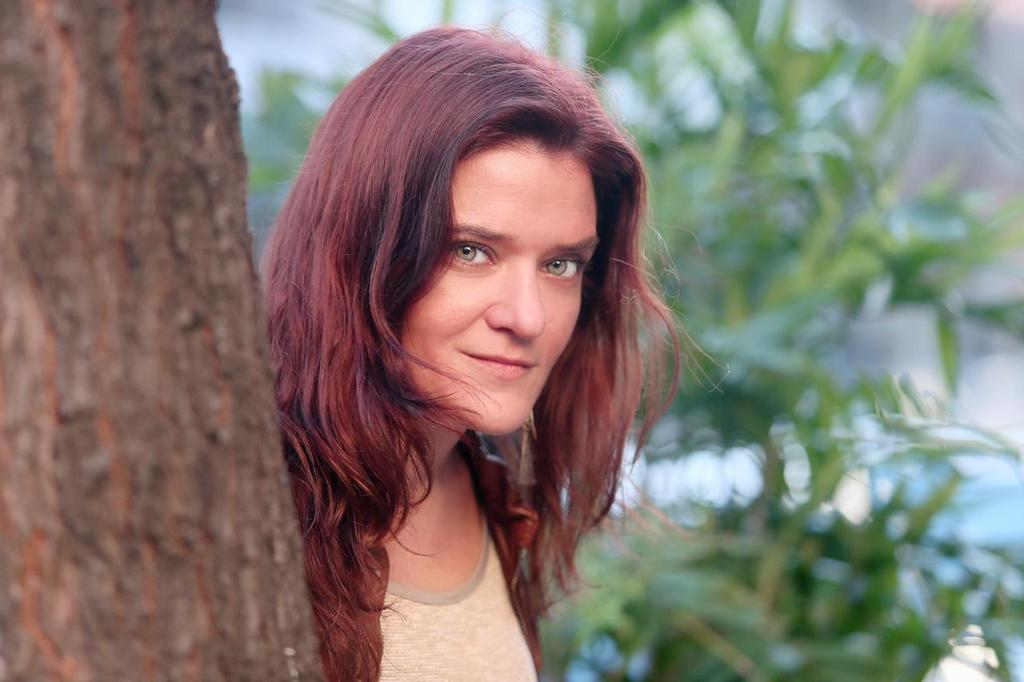
- Florencia Abbate
- Born: December 24, 1976; Buenos Aires, Argentina
- Education: Universidad de Buenos Aires
- Occupations: Writer, poet, journalist
- Employer(s): La Nación, Perfil, Página 12, El País
- Known for: Co-founding the feminist collective Ni una menos

Florencia Abbate (born December 24, 1976, in Buenos Aires) is an Argentine writer, poet and journalist. She is one of the founders of the feminist collective Ni una menos.

She studied literature at the Universidad de Buenos Aires and has worked for different media, such as "La Nación", "Perfil", "Página 12" or "El país" among others.

She was a participating author of the 2004 editor's week in Buenos Aires. In 2007, she spent a "virtual year" in Hamilton, Canada.

== Works ==
=== Novels ===
- Magic Resort, Emecé, Grupo Planeta, 2007. ISBN 978-950-04-2902-3
- El grito, Emecé, Grupo Planeta, 2004. ISBN 978-950-04-2531-5

=== Poetry ===
- Los transparentes, Editorial Libros del Rojas, 2000, with drawings by Adolfo Nigro.
- Una sola alma somos: mapuches, Tantalia, 2006. ISBN 978-987-22809-3-2

=== Essay ===
- Él, ella, ¿ella?, apuntes sobre transexualidad masculina, Editorial Perfil, 1998. ISBN 978-950-639-209-3
- Gilles Deleuze para principiantes, Editorial Era Naciente, 2001, with drawings by Pablo Páez. ISBN 978-987-9065-92-1
- Literatura latinoamericana para principiantes, Editorial Era Naciente, 2003, with drawings by Diego Parés. ISBN 978-987-555-005-6

=== Short stories ===
- Una terraza propia, Editorial Norma, 2006
- Puntos de fuga, Editorial Tantalia, 1996. Travel diary
- Las siete maravillas del mundo, Editorial Estrada, 1996. Tales for children

== See also ==
- Lists of writers
