= Indian ice cream (Canada) =

Canadian whipped confection

Sxusem
- Type: Dessert
- Place of origin: Canada
- Region or state: Pacific Northwest
- Main ingredients: Canada buffaloberry, water; sometimes mild sweeteners

Indian ice cream, also known as sxusem (/ˈskʊʃəm/), is a Canadian whipped confection made from soapberries (Shepherdia canadensis) and other various fruits; it has been eaten as a traditional dessert by many First Nations peoples. It has been suggested that it was first produced in the Interior Salish territory of British Columbia which was located in the upper basins of the Columbia and Fraser rivers, and included tribes such as the Columbia, Lillooet, and Shuswap among others.

== Ingredients ==
The typical ingredient list for Indigenous ice cream includes:

- soapberries
- water
- some kind of sweetener

Sugar is added as needed; the bitterness or sweetness of the berries can vary greatly between bushes, with bitter berries requiring the addition of more sugar.

== Soapberry ==
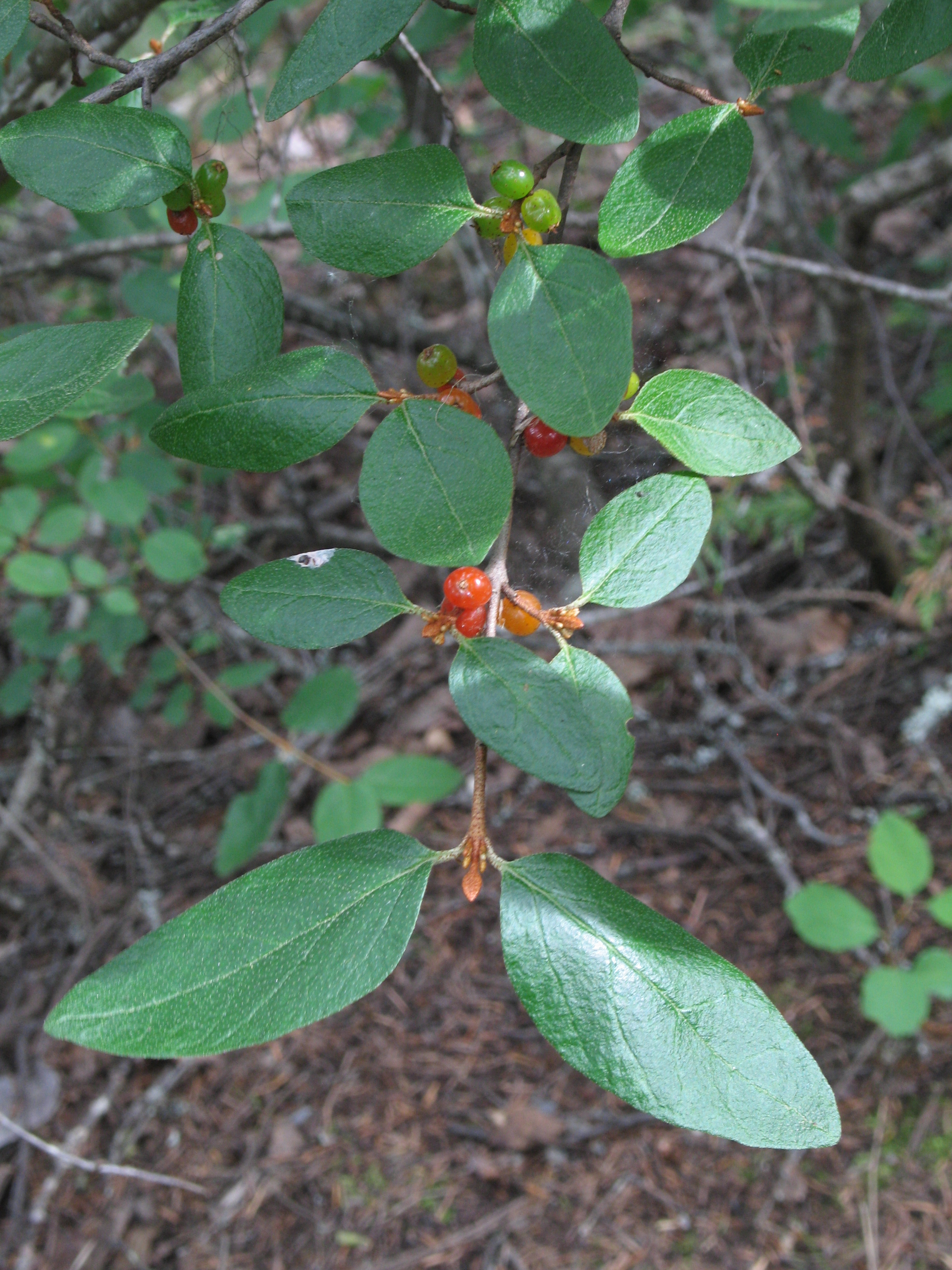
Shepherdia canadensis RF

A soapberry bush is generally described as a small to medium-sized, deciduous, broad-topped tree to 30' tall (max. 45') with pinnately compound leaves, clusters of flowers and a yellowish translucent fruit. Soapberries are part of the Elaeagnaceae family. They are typically found scattered throughout the United States (but are rarely abundantly) in a wide range of soils, along stream bottoms, forest margins, and disturbed areas; southwestern U.S., south-central Plains; northern Mexico.

Unrelated plants in the genus Sapindus produce highly toxic saponins and share the common name soapberry with the edible Canada buffaloberry. Other names for this soapberry include:

- Western soapberry
- wild china (-berry)
- Indian soap-plant
- jaboncilio
- amole de bolita
- Canada buffaloberry
- russet buffaloberry
- foamberry
- soopolallie
- cherioni

== Sweeteners ==
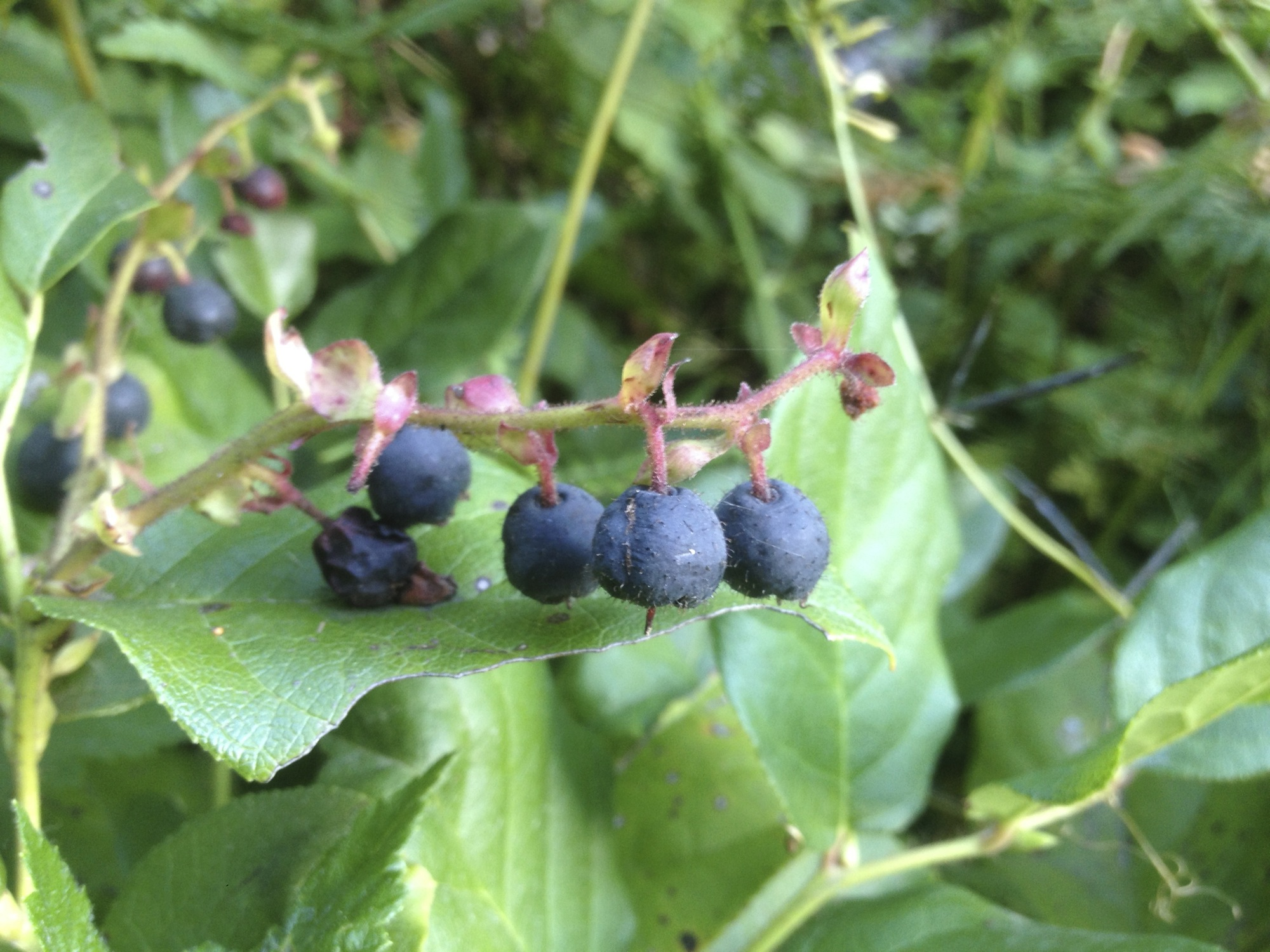
Salal berries

=== Sweet berries ===
==== Salal berries ====
One of the most common sweeteners used with Indian ice cream was salal berries (Gaultheria shallon). The main reason is that they were always available and always delivered a sweet flavour.

==== Thimbleberries ====
Rubus parviflorus, most commonly known as thimbleberry, was extensively harvested by the First Nations peoples for their deliciously sweet taste. They were added to teas or cakes and, of course, Indian ice cream.

=== Mild sweeteners ===
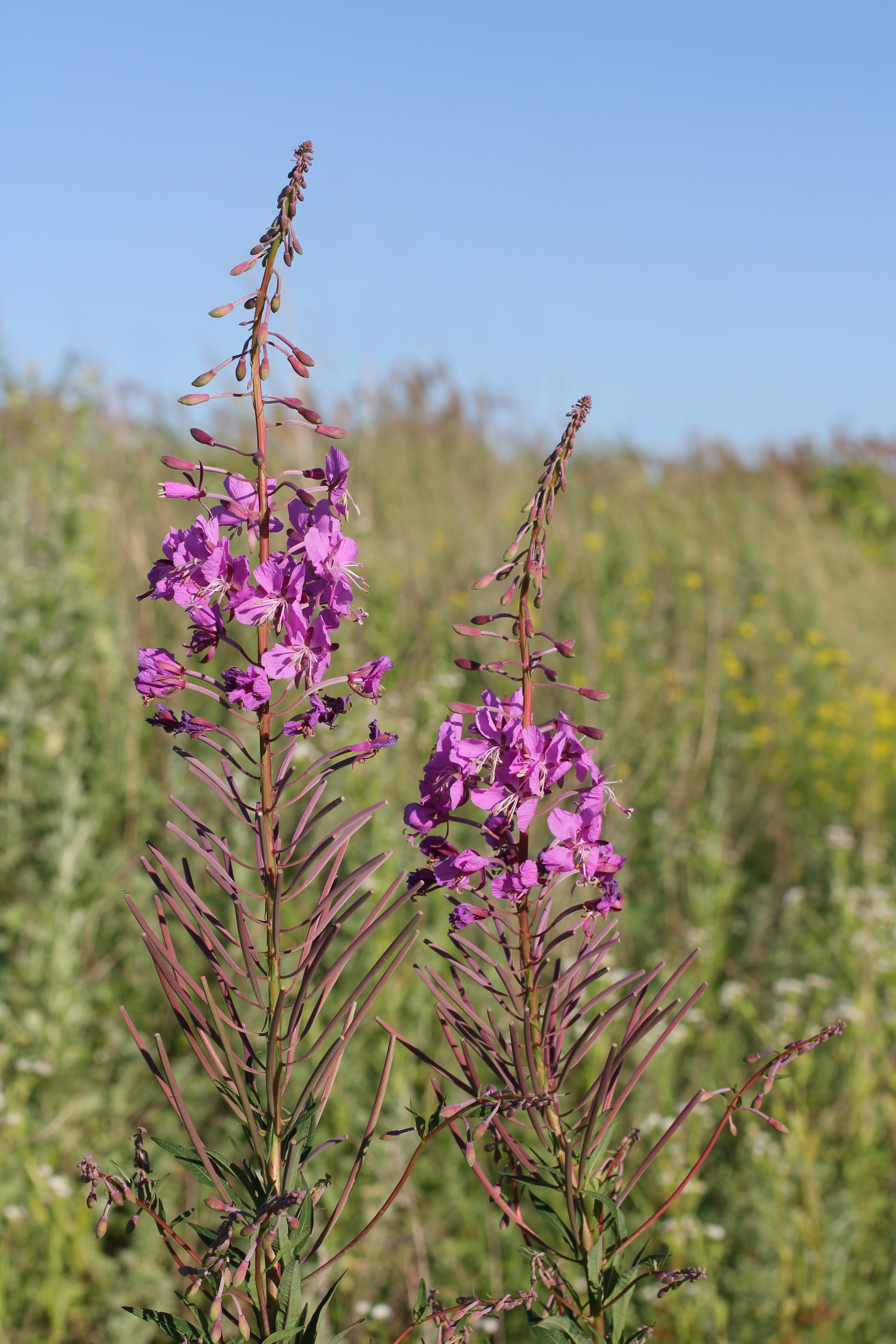
Chamerion angustifolium 2012 G1

==== Fireweed ====
First Nations peoples, such as the Coast Tsimshian people, regularly use Chamaenerion angustifolium, most commonly known as fireweed, as sweeteners in Indian ice cream. They would also use the outer part of the stem as a whipper for the soapberries.

The roots of the Fireweed gives off a bitter taste but the petals have a spicy sweet taste. The petals would be the part that is harvested for making sweeteners.

==== Camas bulb ====
The Camas bulb is part of the herb Cammassia quamash, for which First Nations peoples had many different uses. After the bulb is baked or boiled, it can be eaten like a baked sweet potato but with a sweeter taste. This can then be crushed and mixed together with the whipped sxusem to give it a sweeter taste and a more solid texture.

=== Modern sweeteners ===
==== Cane sugar ====
When sugar was introduced by the first European traders, it changed the eating habits of coastal First Nations people as it was a unique taste to them and it later became a treasured ingredient. It was mixed with Indian ice cream but it was said that too much would ruin the flavour.

== Whipping process ==
The Thompson tribe used timbergrass (Calamoagrostis rubescens) to both dry and whip the berries as well as using the Rocky Mountain maple bark as beaters. Some tribes have also whipped soapberries with bunches of inner cedar bark, thimbleberry branches or salal branches in birch bark bowls. It takes about ten minutes to whip them this way, if whipping briskly.

The berries are placed into a great bowl that is absolutely free of oil or fat and are mixed with a sweetener. The mixture of berries is crushed and vigorously beaten in the manner of whipping cream in order to raise the typical foam of the sxusem confection.

Similar to whipping egg whites, foaming is reduced in the presence of lipid contamination (grease, egg yolk, etc.). Foam depends on the ability of the surfactant (saponins in soapberries, denatured proteins in egg whites) molecules to bind with each other and create a hydrophobic interaction at the interface. When lipids are present, they interfere with this interaction and reduce the viscoelasticity of the foam.

== Nutrition ==
In 125mL (100g) of Indian ice cream, an average of all common recipes, there are 37g of fat, 7g of protein, 130 mg of calcium, and small traces of iron, vitamin A, thiamin, and riboflavin.

125mL (50g) of soapberries contain only 1g protein, 10 mg calcium and traces of fats. To achieve the above nutritional profile, the Indian ice cream recipe used likely has added ingredients which differ from the traditional recipe which could include milk, eggs, nuts and dried fruit.

== Consumption ==
The consistency of the dessert ranges from a thin, frothy liquid to a thick foam, which is determined by the amount of water added to the recipe. First Nations that originate from the Pacific Northwest, Oregon, Upper Tanana, and Flathead regions prefer to use larger amounts of water to attain a frothy drink. Areas like Clallam, Coeur d'Alene, Bella Coola, and Alaska are more familiar with an ice cream-like consistency of their dessert, which comes from using small volumes, or even no water in their recipes.

One variation of the recipe includes adding snow flavoured with smoked mountain goat fat after whipping the berries to give additional flavor. To prepare this, fresh snow is packed into a porous basket and hung high off the ground. Directly beneath it, fat is placed on the surface of a red-hot rock. As the smoke from the cooking of the fat rises to the basket, the snow is steeped with the fragrance of mountain goat fat. Modern variations may include the addition of fruits, such as bananas or raspberries, after whipping to increase the dessert's sweetness.

=== Over-consumption ===
When consumed in large quantities, saponins can lead to vomiting, diarrhea and in extreme cases paralysis and death. Toxicity is extremely rare, however, with the LD50 dose lying between 50 and 100 mg/kg and the typical intake of UK family members at 15 mg per day. The effects of long term exposure can include hypertension, flaccid quadriplegia and hypokalkaemia among others. It is unlikely that Indian ice cream would be consumed in such large quantities as to cause these conditions.

Given that Indian ice cream is composed primarily of trapped air, a more likely consequence of over-consumption is aerophagia, the abdominal discomfort that comes from swallowing too much air. A technique involving blowing bubbles with the ice cream in one's mouth is said to reduce the likelihood of aerophagia.

== Harvesting ==
Soapberry plants exist as either male or female plants, however only the females produce berries. When soapberries are ripe for harvest, they will possess a variety of defining features. The first is color, being shades between that of orange and red and marginally translucent. The second feature that should be observed before harvesting is the size of the soapberry. A ripe soapberry is about 1/4-inch or less in diameter. The third defining characteristic of a ripe soapberry is its texture. If crushed, the ripe berries will produce a soapy foam. Finally, taste can be used as a measure of ripeness. Deemed by its bitter effects on the palate, a soapberry can be considered ready for harvest via taste. Soapberries are harvested in dry areas during the summer months of July, August, and September.

Once ripe, soapberries are harvested not by handpicking them off the bush, but by use of a branch as a tool for knocking the ripe berries onto a collecting blanket below the bush. This method ensures that only the berries possessing the previously mentioned characteristics are collected for use.

== Saponins ==
=== Role in biology ===
Saponins are the chemical compound which give soapberries their bitter taste and distinctive foaming abilities. As a component in the roots, stems, leaves, flowers, and fruits of the shrub, it serves as protection against the growth of bacteria and fungus, as well as the foraging by insects and small animals.

Herniaria Saponin I

=== Role in colloidal dispersions: foam ===
Saponins are composed of polar sugar groups and non-polar groups of either steroids or triterpenes. This allows saponins, like other surfactants, to reduce the interfacial (or surface) tension found at the oil-water or air-water interface. In Indian ice cream, the reduced interfacial tension stabilizes the foam, greatly enhancing the foamability of the aqueous solution.

In this capacity, it is the saponins found in soapberries that allow the formation of Indian ice cream. Like beating an egg white, agitating the soap berries introduces air into solution. Without a surfactant like the denatured proteins of egg whites or in this case, saponins, the air would quickly escape and the mixture would return to a solution. However, by stabilizing the interface of the dispersed and continuous phases of the foam, the air remains trapped in the agitated berry solution.

When compared to sodium lauryl sulfate (SLS), a common synthetic detergent, saponins achieved only 37% of SLS foam height but a similar resistance to decay after being formed. This suggests that some properties of saponin foams are comparable to synthetic foams.

== Additional uses ==
Saponin extraction can be executed in many ways. One of the most common soapberry processing method begins by crushing the berries, then soaking them in water, followed by treating the soapberry liquid with an aerated floating process which produces bubbles. Finally, the bubbles may be collected and left to set to form saponin extract. This saponin extract can then be used for many additional purposes.

Soapberries have multiple uses besides that of a key ingredient in the popular Indian ice cream. Such uses include detergent for laundry, shampoo and soap. Soapberries can act as industrial emulsifiers, moistening agents, or foaming agents, and thus can be used as ingredients in multiple products for hygiene purposes. Saponins from natural sources like soapberries are currently approved for beverages in the EU to stabilize some beverage foams.

Furthermore, some pharmacological effects, such as molluscicidal anti-inflammatory, antimicrobial, anthelmintic, antidermatophytic, antitussives and cytotoxic activities have been demonstrated in the saponins of plants.

== Storage ==
Traditionally, soapberries were sun dried and stored in cedar boxes layered with thimbleberry leaves for protection. In the present, they can be frozen in well-packed containers or canned in tin through thermal processing. Containers used to store these berries were not used for cooking or any other purposes to ensure grease would not come in contact with them.

== See also ==
- Indian ice cream (Alaska)
- Akutaq
- List of desserts
