= Eskimo Joe (disambiguation) =

Eskimo Joe are an Australian alternative rock band, formed in 1997.

Eskimo Joe may also refer to:

- Eskimo Joe (EP), the band's eponymous 1999 EP
- Eskimo Joe (video), the band's eponymous 2005 DVD
- Eskimo Joe's, a restaurant and bar located in Stillwater, Oklahoma

== See also ==
- Eskimo (disambiguation)
- Joe (disambiguation)
