= Screamer (disambiguation) =

Screamer is a family of bird species.

Screamer may also refer to:

== Books ==
- Screamer magazine, a Los Angeles area music publication
- Screamers, a Hardy Boys novel

== Entertainment ==
- Screamer (1995 video game), a PC racing video game
- Screamer (2026 video game), a racing video game, reboot of the 1996 game
- "Screamers" (Beavis and Butt-head episode)

== Film ==
- Screamers (1995 film), a film based on the short story "Second Variety" by Philip K. Dick
- Screamers (2006 film), a documentary by Carla Garapedian and System of a Down
- #Screamers (2016 film), an American horror-mystery film
- Screamers (1979 film), directed by Sergio Martino

== Music ==
- Screamer, a member of a musical ensemble designated to provide screamed vocals
- Screamer (march), a style of march music used in circus marches
- Ibanez Tube Screamer, an overdrive pedal in electronic sound effects
- The Screamers, an electropunk band from 1975 to 1981
- Screamer (album), by Third Eye Blind, 2019 or the title track
- "Screamer", a 2000 song by Good Charlotte from Good Charlotte

== Places ==
- Screamer, Alabama
- Screamer, Tennessee
- Screamer Mountain, a mountain in Rabun County, Georgia

== Transportation ==
- Armstrong Siddeley Screamer, a rocket engine intended to power the Avro 720 interceptor aircraft
- EMD F40PH or Screamer, a locomotive
- Screamer pipe, in automobile modification
- WDM-2, Indian Railways locomotive, when the horn has a very high-pitched sound

== Other uses ==
- Screamer, a fiercely-hit shot on goal from long range in association football
- Screamer, an alternative name for the exclamation mark
- Internet screamer, an image or video that unexpectedly frightens the viewer
- Spectacular mark or screamer, a type of mark in Australian rules football
- The Screamers, a name for the primal therapy commune Atlantis
- Someone who screams
