= Esquimalt (disambiguation) =

Esquimalt is a municipality in British Columbia.

Esquimalt may also refer to:

- CFB Esquimalt, a Canadian Forces naval base, originally the Royal Navy's Pacific Station headquarters
- Esquimalt Royal Navy Dockyard or Esquimalt Station (1842–1905)
- HMCS Esquimalt, a Bangor-class minesweeper from World War II
- Esquimalt Harbour, a body of water flanked by the District of Esquimalt, the Town of View Royal, and the City of Colwood
- Esquimalt First Nation, a First Nations band government
- Esquimalt people, signatories to the Douglas Treaties as the Whyomilth
- Esquimalt (electoral district), a defunct provincial electoral district
- Esquimalt Airport (CYPF), a former airport
- Esquimalt railway station

== See also ==
- MV Queen of Esquimalt, Victoria-class ferry
- Eskimo (disambiguation)
