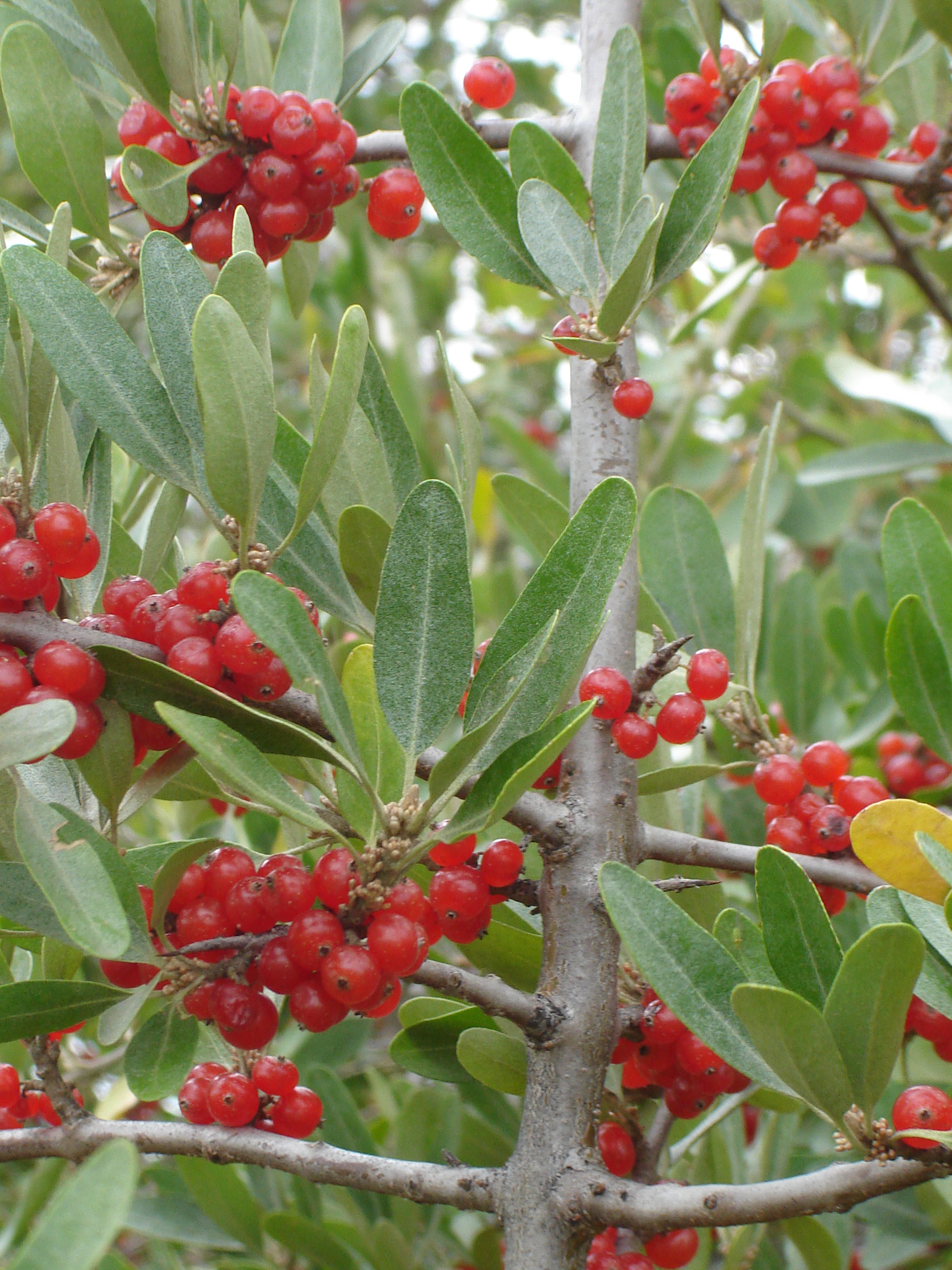
- Shepherdia argentea

Scientific classification
- Kingdom: Plantae
- Clade: Tracheophytes
- Clade: Angiosperms
- Clade: Eudicots
- Clade: Rosids
- Order: Rosales
- Family: Elaeagnaceae
- Genus: Shepherdia; Nutt.

Species
- See text

Synonyms
- Lepargyrea Raf.; Leptargyreia Schltdl.

= Shepherdia =

Family of shrubs

Shepherdia, commonly called buffaloberry or bullberry, is a genus of small shrubs in the Elaeagnaceae family. The plants are native to northern and western North America. They are non-legume nitrogen fixers.

Shepherdia is dioecious, with male and female flowers produced on separate plants.

== Species ==
The genus has three living species:

- Shepherdia argentea - silver buffaloberry
- Shepherdia canadensis - Canada buffaloberry
- Shepherdia rotundifolia - roundleaf buffaloberry, endemic to southern Utah and northern Arizona

An additional extinct species is also placed in the genus:

- †Shepherdia weaveri (Hollick) LaMotte - Paleocene/Eocene Kachemak Bay, Alaska

== Fruit ==
The berry is recognizable by being a dark shade of red, with little white dots on them. They are rough to the touch, and are found on both trees and shrubs.

=== Wildlife ===
The plants have rather bitter-tasting berries. The fruit are often eaten by bears to maintain fat stores during hibernation.

Buffaloberries are used as food plants by the larvae of some Lepidoptera species, including Ectropis crepuscularia (recorded from S. canadensis) and Coleophora elaeagnisella.

=== As food ===
Buffaloberries are sour and can be made into jam, pie, jelly, syrup, soups, or prepared like cranberry sauce with sugar added.
