= Wastegate =

Component in a turbocharger system

A wastegate is a valve that controls the flow of exhaust gases to the turbine wheel in a turbocharged engine system.

Diversion of exhaust gases regulates the turbine speed, which in turn regulates the rotating speed of the compressor. The primary function of a wastegate is to regulate the maximum boost pressure in turbocharger systems, to protect the engine and turbocharger. One of the earliest production vehicles to use a modern wastegate was the Saab 99 Turbo, with pre-series turbo vehicles being introduced in 1977.

== Wastegate types ==
=== External ===
An external wastegate is a separate self-contained mechanism typically used with turbochargers that do not have internal wastegates. An external wastegate requires a specially constructed exhaust manifold with a dedicated port for the wastegate, which can either be mounted directly on the exhaust housing or connected via runners remotely. A remote configuration allows for a smaller area over radius (A/R) turbine housing, resulting in less lag time before the turbo begins to spool and create boost. External wastegates are generally better at regulating boost levels more precisely than internal wastegates, as internal wastegates use a simple flap/hinge which create turbulence and can struggle to allow enough flow at higher engine RPMs. This can cause boost creep, an uncontrolled boost rise. External wastegates can physically be much larger than internal wastegates because there is no constraint of integrating the valve and spring into the turbocharger's turbine housing. It is possible to use an external wastegate with an internally gated turbocharger, which is typically achieved through restricting the movement of the internal wastegate's actuator arm, keeping it from opening.

External wastegates generally use a valve similar to the poppet valve found in the cylinder head of four-stroke internal combustion engines. However, this valve is controlled by pneumatics rather than mechanical force (such as from a camshaft), and opens outward rather than inward. External wastegates can also use a butterfly valve, though that is far less common.

An external wastegate's exhaust may be "atmospheric", dumping exhaust gases directly into the atmosphere, instead of returning them with the rest of an engine's exhaust. This may be done to prevent turbulence to the exhaust flow and reduce total back pressure in the exhaust system. An atmospheric wastegate dump pipe is commonly referred to as a screamer pipe due to the un-muffled waste exhaust gases and the associated loud noises they produce.

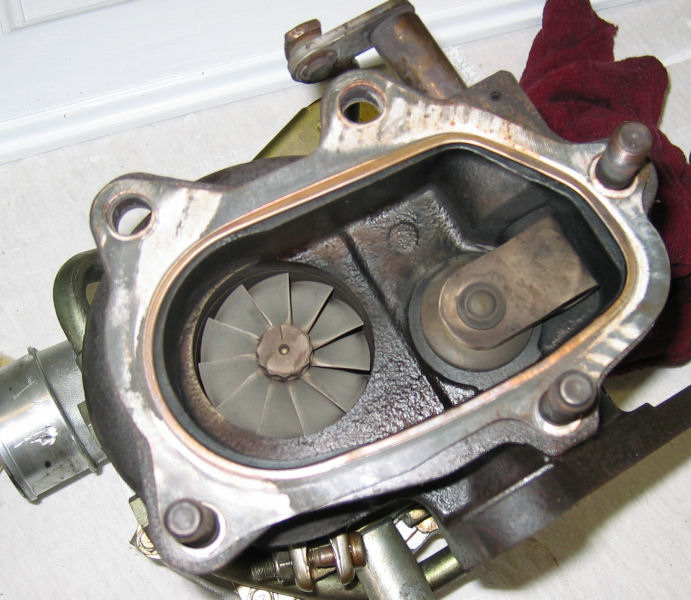
An internally gated turbocharger. The internal gate is located to the right of the turbine wheel, but built into the turbine housing. Partially seen at the top is the wastegate actuator arm.

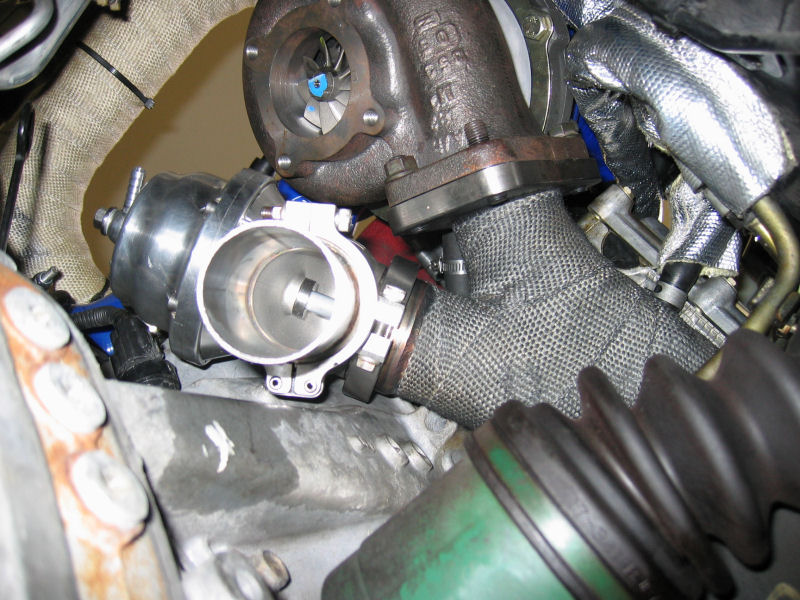
An external wastegate installed next to a turbocharger.

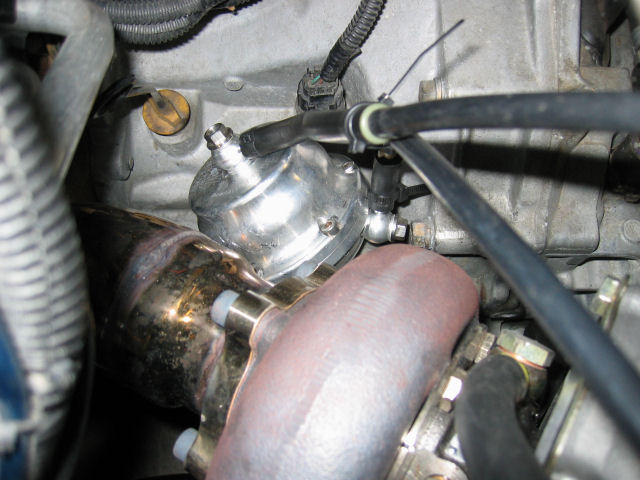
A dual port 44 mm (1.7 in) wastegate. The side port is the primary port. The top port is the secondary port and not necessary for proper operation.

=== Internal ===
An internal wastegate is built into the turbocharger housing, and uses a bypass valve/flapper which allows excess exhaust pressure to bypass the turbine directly into the downstream exhaust. The internal wastegate valve may be pneumatically controlled, however car manufacturers have generally switched to electronically controlled wastegate actuators.

Advantages of an internal wastegate include simpler and more compact installation, with no external piping needed. Additionally, all waste exhaust gases are automatically routed back into the catalytic converter and exhaust system. Many OEM turbochargers are internal wastegates. Disadvantages in comparison to an external wastegate include a limited ability to bleed off exhaust pressure due to the relatively small diameter of the internal bypass valve, and exhaust turbulance. These issues can cause boost creep.

== Control ==
=== Manual ===
The simplest control for a wastegate is a mechanical linkage that allows the operator to directly control the wastegate valve position. Manual control is used in some turbo-charged light aircraft.

=== Pneumatic ===
The simplest control for a wastegate is to supply a control signal via boost pressure directly from the charged (pressurized) air section of engine intake to the wastegate actuator. This is typically done using a small hose connected to pressurized sections of the intake. The wastegate will open further as the boost pressure pushes against the force of the spring in the wastegate actuator until equilibrium is obtained. More intelligent control can be added by integrating an electronic boost controller.

A wastegate may have a single or dual port, with a dual port wastegate adding a second port on the opposite side of the actuator. Air pressure allowed to enter this second port aids the spring to push keep the wastegate closed as boost pressure builds. Use of the second port is not necessary. Secondary ports, unlike primary ports, typically requires a multi-port (3-way or 4-way) solenoid valve or dual-solenoid setup to correctly balance the pressure differential across the internal diaphragm. CO_{2} can also be used to apply pressure to the second port, to control boost on a much finer level.

=== Electric ===
Some 1940s aircraft engines featured electrically operated wastegates, such as the Wright R-1820 on the B-17 Flying Fortress. General Electric was the biggest manufacturer of these analog systems. Pilots had a cockpit control to select different boost levels. Engineering mandates kept engine control systems separate from the aircraft's primary electrical architecture.

Beginning in the 2011 model year, Hyundai began offering the 2.0-liter Theta II turbocharged gasoline direct-injection (GDI) engine in the Sonata, which included a PCM-operated electronic servo wastegate actuator. This allows a boost control strategy that reduces exhaust backpressure caused by the turbocharger by opening the wastegate when turbo boost is not needed, resulting in improved fuel economy. The wastegate is also held open during cold starting to lower emissions by speeding up initial catalyst light-off.

Starting in November 2015, Honda began shipping vehicles with direct-injected 1.5-liter turbocharged engines, which used an ECU-driven electric wastegate. This was first introduced in the Honda Civic 2016 model and followed by the CR-V in 2017. In 2018 1.5L and 2.0L turbocharged direct injected engines replaced the 2.4L and 3.5L 6 cylinder naturally aspirated engines in the Honda Accord.

=== Hydraulic ===
Many turbocharged, piston-engine aircraft utilize a hydraulic wastegate control system that uses engine oil as the actuating fluid. Systems manufactured by companies such as Lycoming and Continental operate on identical physical principles, utilizing similar components that vary mostly by naming convention. Within the wastegate actuator, an internal spring applies mechanical force to drive the wastegate butterfly valve to a fully open position, while regulated engine oil pressure counteracts the spring to force the valve closed.

A density controller, an aneroid-regulated oil valve that references upper-deck pressure (compressor discharge pressure), is positioned on the outlet side of the wastegate actuator to regulate how rapidly oil bleeds from the actuator back into the engine crankcase. As the aircraft climbs into thinner air and ambient air density drops, the density controller progressively restricts the oil bleed valve. This traps more oil volume within the wastegate actuator housing, forcing the wastegate to close, which accelerates turbine wheel speed to maintain the engine's rated power up to its critical altitude.

Some installations supplement this loop with a differential pressure controller. This secondary device senses the absolute pressure differential across the engine's throttle plate and modulates the wastegate to maintain a predetermined pressure split. By preventing excessive compressor discharge pressures during part-throttle operations, the differential pressure controller minimizes unnecessary turbocharger workload, optimizes transient spool-up time, and eliminates the cyclic manifold pressure fluctuations known as bootstrapping.

== Wastegate sizing ==
Wastegate sizing is inversely proportional to the targeted level of boost pressure, and is dictated by the total volume of exhaust gas that must be bypassed. In configurations where a large turbocharger is operated at a low target boost pressure, the wastegate must divert a high volume of exhaust gas away from the turbine wheel to restrict its shaft speed, requiring a larger diameter wastegate valve to prevent boost creep.

Conversely, when a turbocharger is run at high boost pressures or within racing applications, the turbine wheel requires the vast majority of the engine's exhaust energy to maintain high shaft speeds. Because only a minimal amount of exhaust gas needs to be bled off in high-boost scenarios, a smaller wastegate valve can be utilized effectively.

== See also ==
- Automatic Performance Control (APC)
- Dump valve
- Exhaust gas recirculation (EGR)
