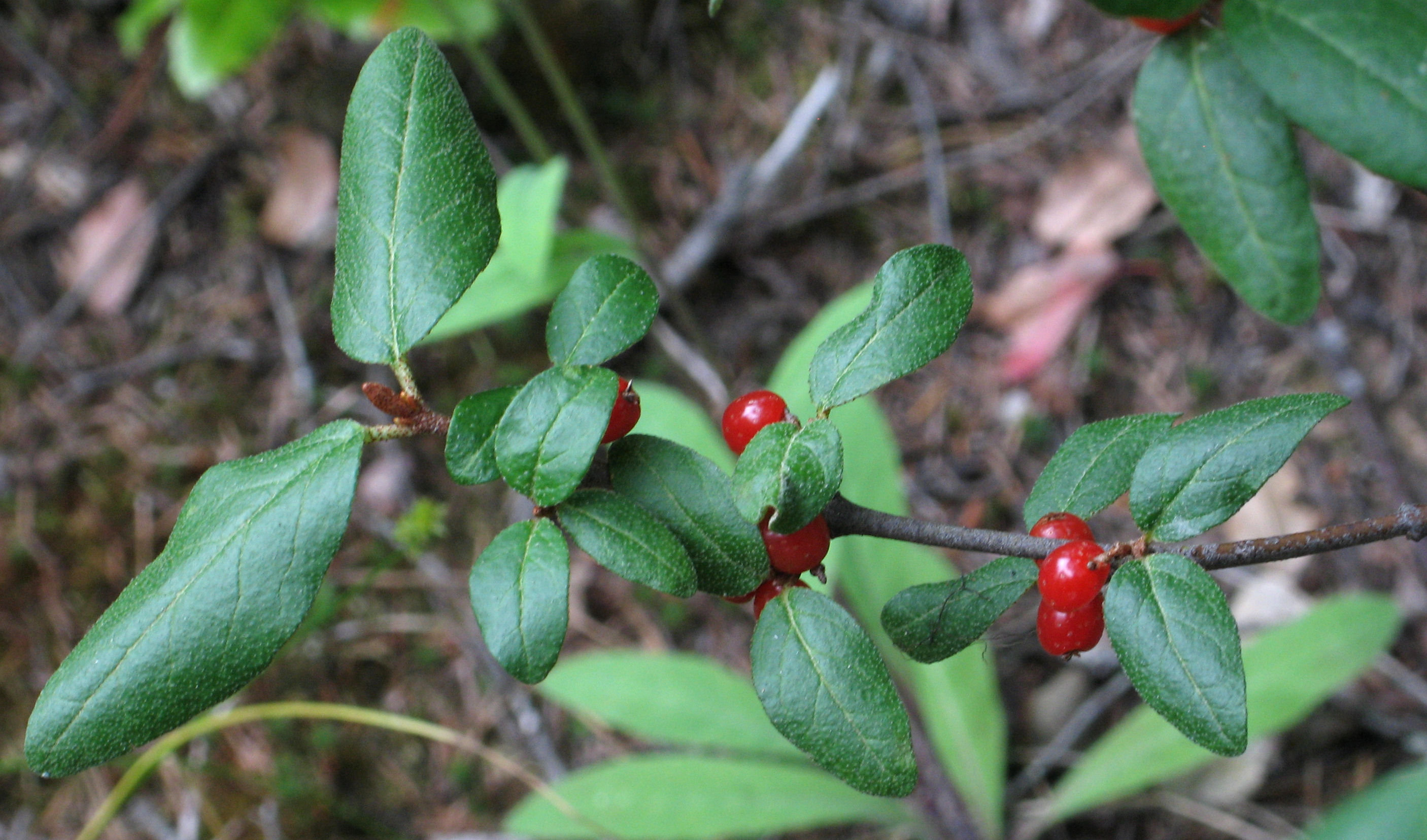
- Leaves and berries

Conservation status
- Secure (NatureServe)

Scientific classification
- Kingdom: Plantae
- Clade: Tracheophytes
- Clade: Angiosperms
- Clade: Eudicots
- Clade: Rosids
- Order: Rosales
- Family: Elaeagnaceae
- Genus: Shepherdia
- Species: S. canadensis

Binomial name
- Shepherdia canadensis (L.) Nutt.

Synonyms
- Elaeagnus canadensis (L.) A.Nelson (1935); Hippophae canadensis L. (1753); Lepargyrea canadensis (L.) Greene (1892)

= Shepherdia canadensis =

North American species of buffaloberry

Shepherdia canadensis, commonly called Canada buffaloberry, russet buffaloberry, soopolallie, soapberry, or foamberry (Ktunaxa: kupaʔtiⱡ) is one of a small number of shrubs of the genus Shepherdia that bears edible berries.

== Description ==
The plant is a non-legume nitrogen fixing deciduous shrub and can grow to a maximum of 1–4 m (3–13 ft). The leaves are 6.5 cm (2.6 in) long, green above, and whitish and brownish below. Leaves are opposite on the stem and have short petioles. Flowers grow in clusters and do not have petals but rather produce 4 triangular yellow or brown fused lobes. The flowers are unisex and grow on the leaf axils and are about 0.32–0.42 cm (0.13–0.17 in) in diameter. Shepherdia canadensis is a single sex dioecious plant. Males and female flowers grow on separate plants that do not self-fertilize. Male flowers have 8 stamens and females have one pistil and an urn-shaped hypanthium and both have nectar glands.

The fruit is about 0.6 cm (0.24 in) in diameter and are usually red, though the sub species S. canadensis forma xanthocarpa Reh has yellow berries. Each berry contains one seed that is rusty brown in color surrounded by a juicy pulp that has a soap-like texture, giving it the nickname "soapberry". The berries have a bitter taste due to their saponin content.

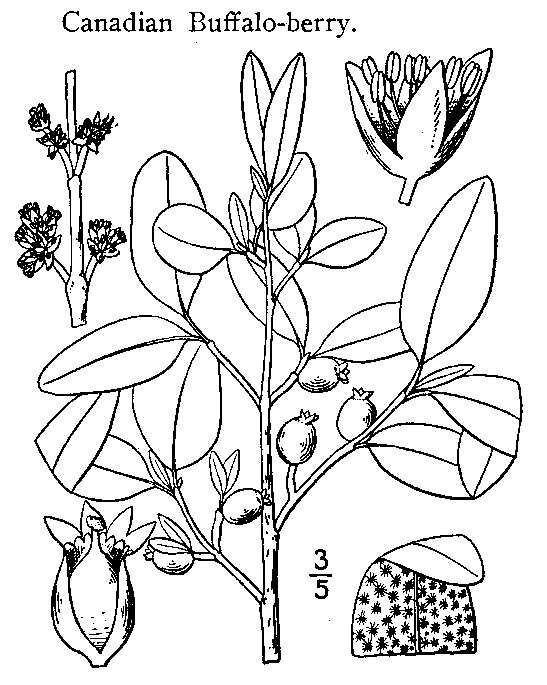
Drawing by Nathaniel Lord Britton (1913)

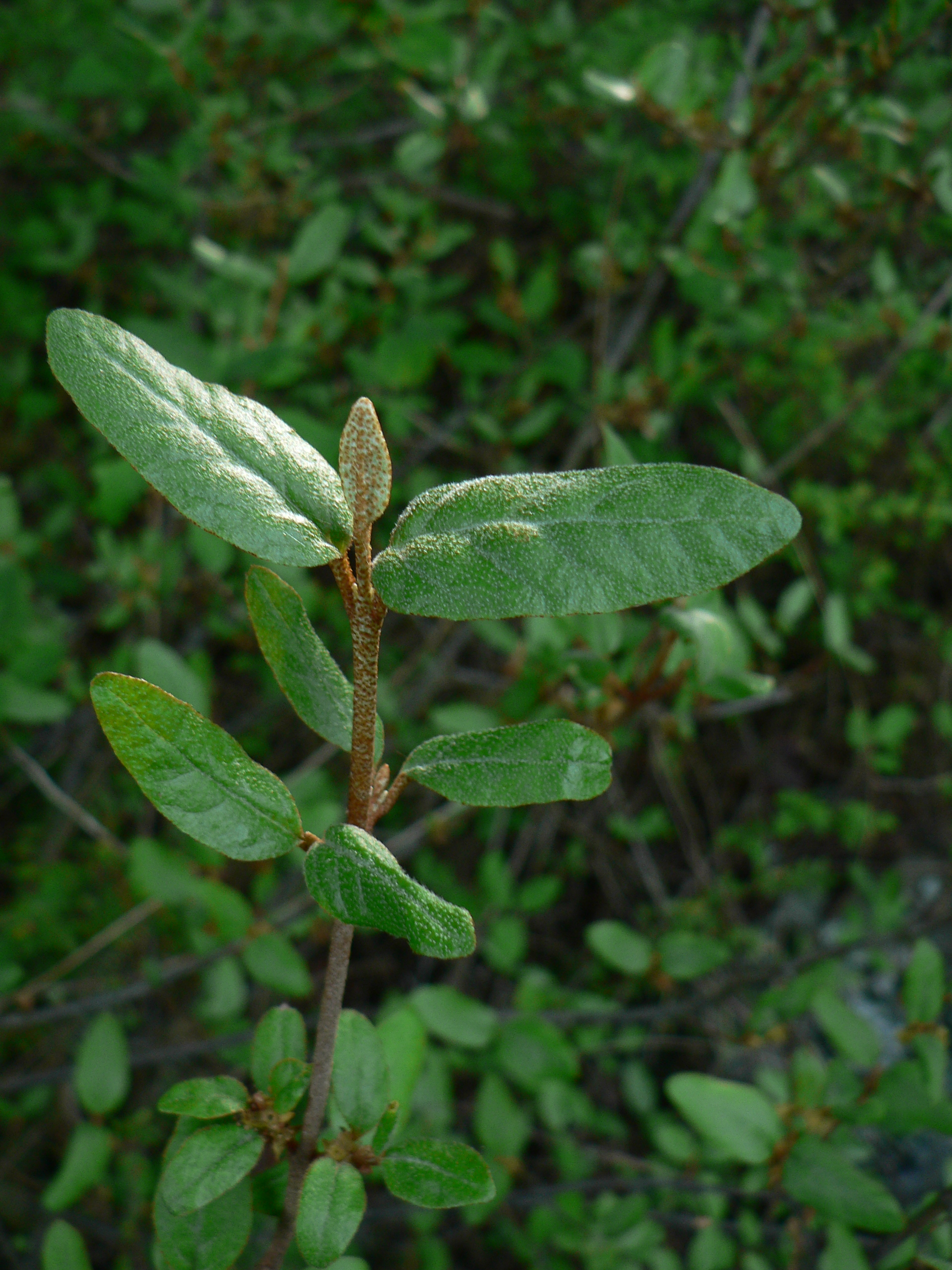
Leaves

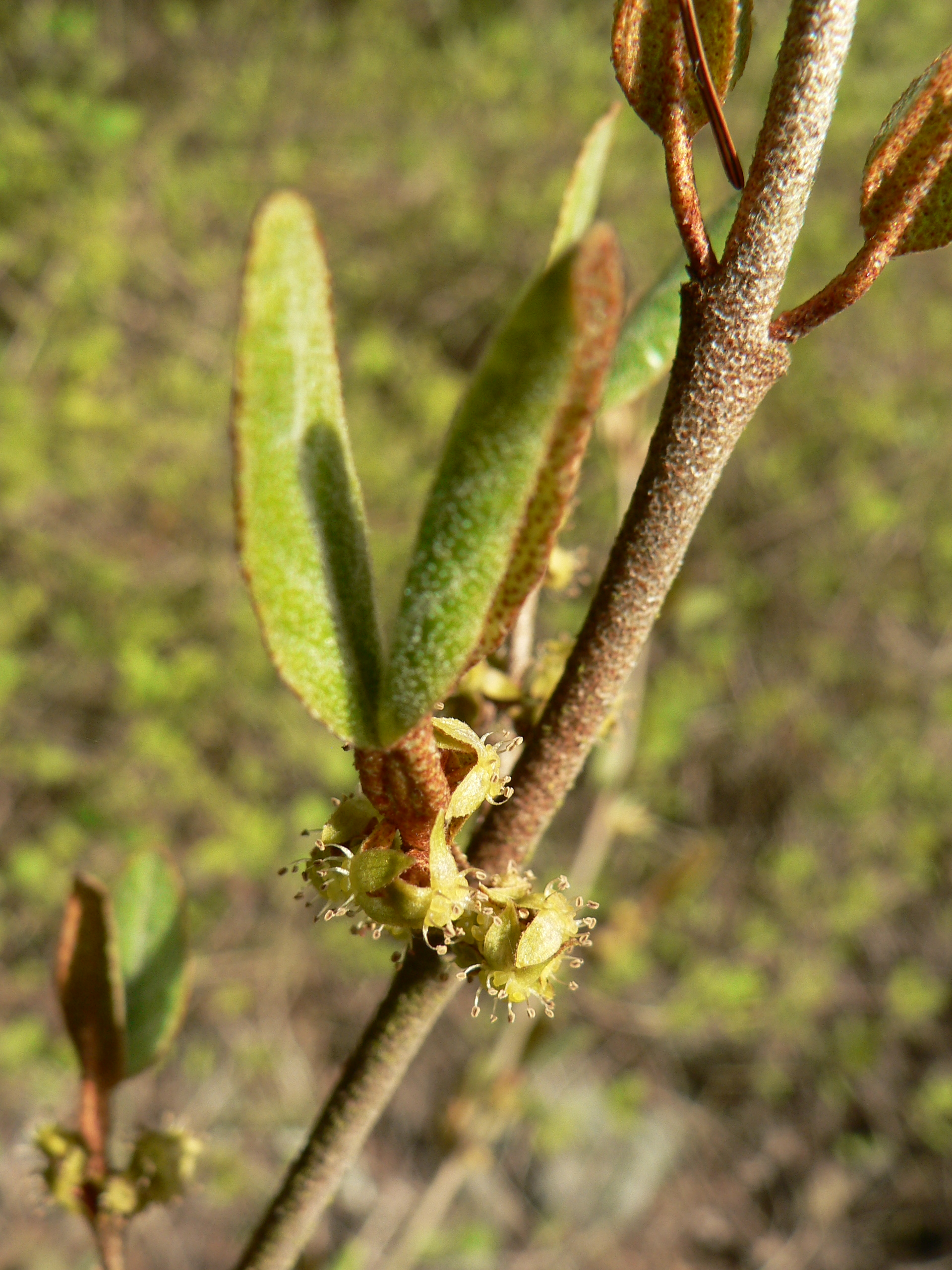
Staminate flowers

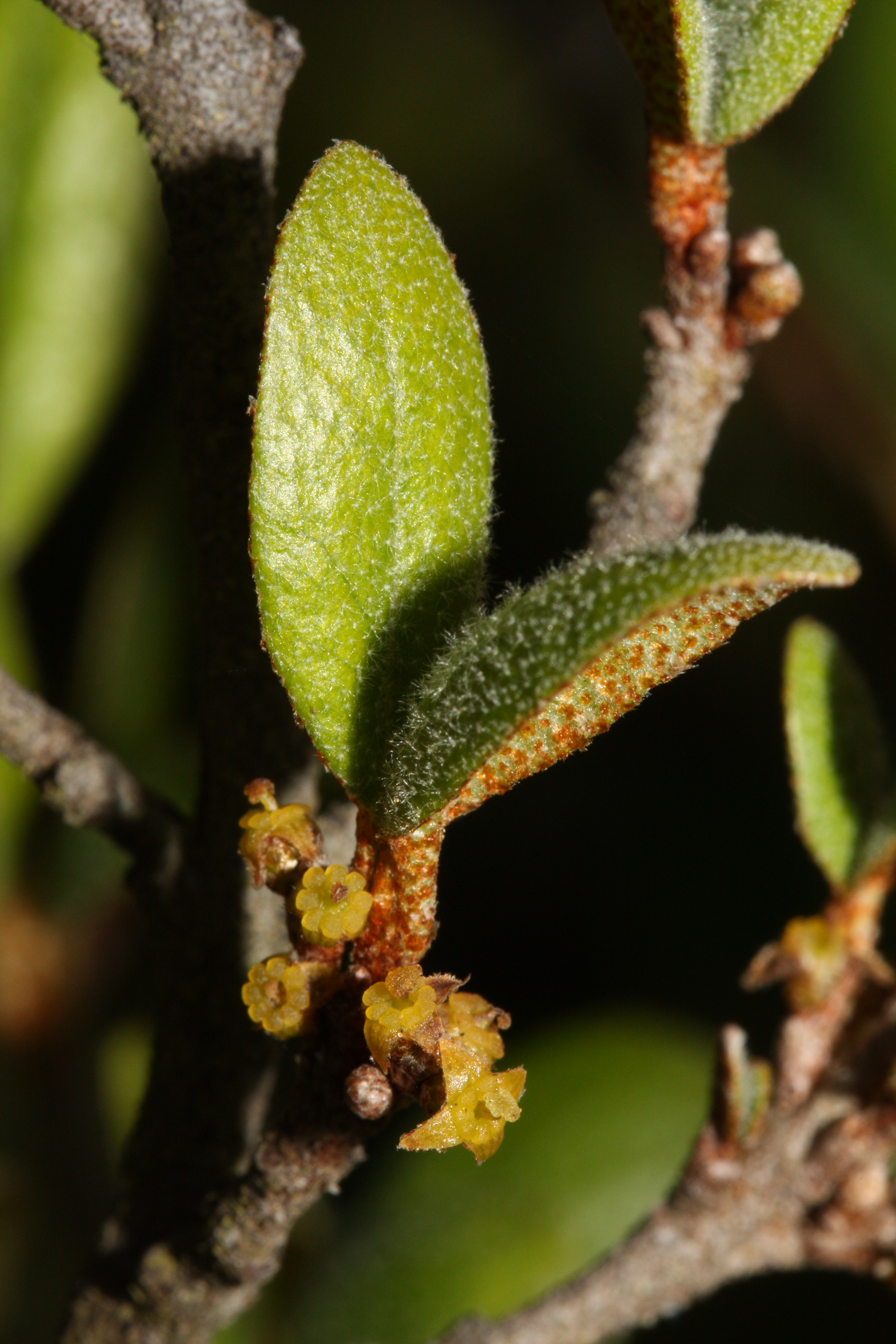
Pistillate flowers

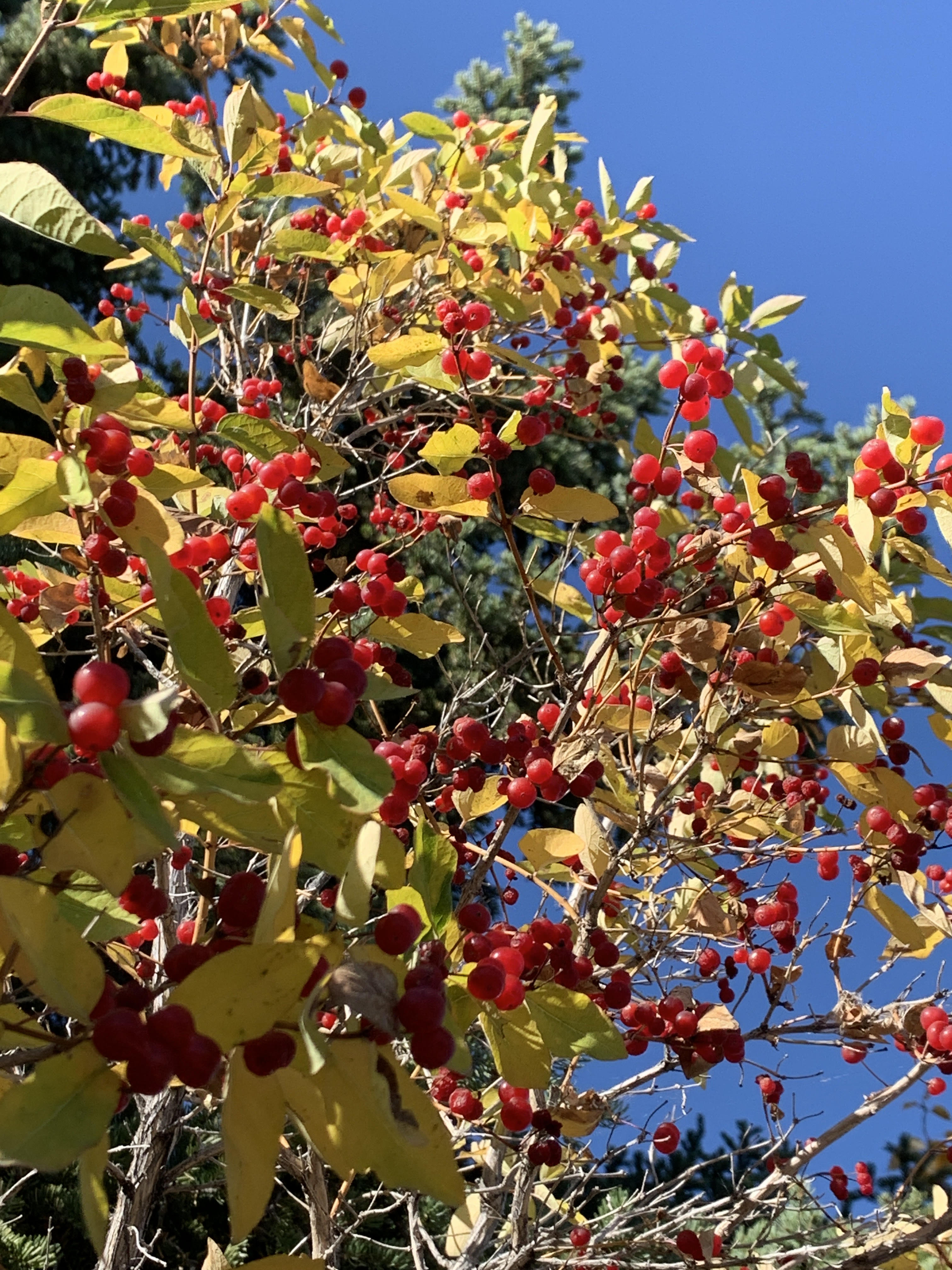
Berries

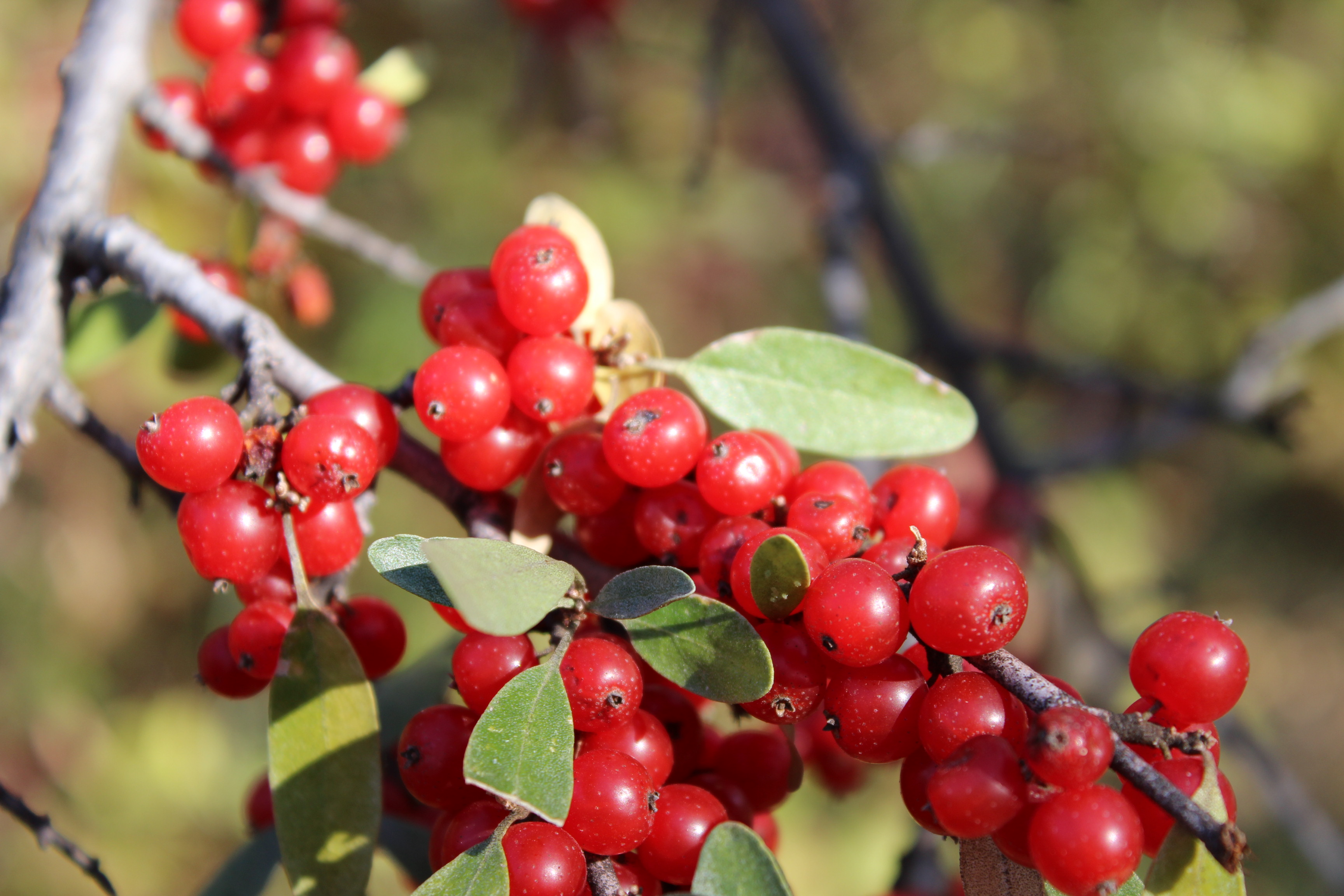
Close-up of berries

== Etymology ==
Shepherdia canadensis is named for British botanist and curator of the Liverpool Botanical Gardens, John Shepherd who lived from 1764-1836, with the epithet meaning "from Canada", due to its widespread distribution between North America and Canada. The common name of the plant in British Columbia is "soopolallie", a word derived from the historic Chinook Jargon trading language spoken in the North American Pacific Northwest in the 19th and early 20th centuries. The name is a composite of the Chinook words "soop" (soap) and "olallie" (berry).

== Distribution and habitat ==
The species is widespread in all of Canada, except in Prince Edward Island, and in the western and northern United States, including Alaska and Idaho.

It grows in non-wetlands and forested areas (in openings and understories), often growing on shores of rivers and lakes, mountain outcroppings and cliffed regions where bedrock has a high-pH content.

== Ecology ==
Shepherdia canadensis follows the C3 carbon fixing photosynthetic pathway making it well suited to boreal and mountainous environments, where temperatures are moderate during the growing season. Combined with its ability to fix nitrogen, this allows the species to grow in dry, rocky and nutrient-poor soils, further extending its ecological niche. It grows in burn areas or disturbed sites to create fertile ground with usable nitrogen for other plants and provide cover for animals.

Shepherdia canadensis form a deep growing taproot that sprouts from the root crown with fibrous, branching roots that are shallow and have rhizomatous root nodules growing on them.

Insects, typically Syrphidae flies, are the main pollinator. For successful pollination both sexes must be present. An insect transfers pollen from a pollen-producing male flower to a female flower, which produces the nectar and fruit. It is difficult to distinguish male and female flowers so it was found that the insects typically visit each sex at equal rates.

== Uses ==
The fruit is edible, but the saponin chemicals it contains may cause gastrointestinal irritation if large quantities are consumed. Unrelated plants in the genus Sapindus, also commonly denominated "soapberry", produce toxic saponins.

Some Canadian First Nations peoples such as Nlaka'pamux (Thompson), St'at'imc (Lillooet), and Secwepemc (Shuswap) in the Province of British Columbia extensively collect the berries. The bitter berries (which may be sweetened by frosts) are processed with other berries as Indian ice cream. The saponins create a foam when the berry is whipped into a dessert dish. First Nations peoples believe that the berry has many health properties and it was used by Sioux to treat gastrointestinal illnesses. Native-themed restaurants in British Columbia have occasionally offered the berries on their menus.
