= Eskimo Hill =

Mountain in Alaska, United States

Coordinates: 69°22′N 159°46′W

Eskimo Hill [el. 1,053 ft (321 m)] is summit in North Slope Borough, Alaska, United States.

Eskimo Hill was named in 1924.
