= Screamer pipe =

A screamer pipe is a type of exhaust configuration fitted to some automotive turbocharged petrol engines with an external wastegate set-up, which vents the waste exhaust to the atmosphere through a separate un-muffled pipe, rather than back into the main exhaust track. This exhaust setup is known for its loud noise.

== Principle of operation ==
To regulate the boost pressure on turbocharged engines a wastegate is fitted to allow exhaust gases to bypass the turbine and flow straight down the exhaust down-pipe. This can cause turbulent airflow around the turbine and high exhaust back pressure. To overcome this problem, gases can be re-routed down a separate pipe and vented straight to the atmosphere, resulting in improved performance.

== Limitations ==
This configuration allows exhaust gases to flow straight to the atmosphere, therefore they do not pass through the catalytic converter or exhaust silencer, which renders it illegal for street use in many countries owing to noise and exhaust emission regulations. Although exhaust emission laws do not apply away from the public highways in most countries, many race tracks have strict noise rules in place, once again outlawing screamer pipe use.
