= El grito (novel) =

Novel by Florencia Abbate

El grito (Spanish: The Scream) is an Argentine novel by Florencia Abbate on her debut. It was first published in 2004.

== Summary ==
El grito is a short novel that takes place at the end of 2001 in Buenos Aires, Argentina, amid the economic meltdown that brought the country to the brink of social disintegration. The story follows four characters whose lives are slowly intertwined, and whose fates and problems, although different, are characteristic of the social and economic problems of the time. Helplessness, loneliness, and broken families are among the rivers that Florencia Abbate helps the reader to navigate in this novel that examines a historical period in Argentina that is seldom explored.

== Main characters ==
- Federico, a young man who is obsessed with the book Suicide by Durkheim
- Horacio, a former guerrilla
- Peter, an interior decorator
- Clara, a sculptor with leukemia
