= Eskimo Pass =

Mountain pass in Nunavut, Canada

- Location within Nunavut

Third Approach
- Location: Nunavut, Canada
- Coordinates: 66°41′02″N 062°13′48″W
- Topo map: NTS 16L9 Inuk Mountain

Eskimo Pass is a mountain pass in the southern Baffin Mountains, Nunavut, Canada.
