= Scream (Billy Idol song) =

Single by Billy Idol

from the album Devil's Playground
- B-side: "Bleeding Me Insane"
- Released: 2005
- Genre: Hard rock
- Label: Sanctuary
- Songwriters: Billy Idol; Brian Tichy
- Producer: Keith Forsey

Billy Idol singles chronology
| "Don't You (Forget About Me)" (2001) | "Scream" (2005) | "John Wayne" (2008) |

Music video
- "Scream" on YouTube

"Scream" is a song by the English rock singer Billy Idol, released in 2005 as the only single from his sixth studio album Devil's Playground. His first hit song in over a decade, the last being 1994's "Speed", it reached No. 54 on German charts, and No. 26 on US Mainstream Rock charts. The song was also number one on rollingstone.com's most played list.

== Composition and lyrics ==
Scream" is a hard rock song written by Billy Idol and Brian Tichy. An uptempo number and companion piece to "Rebel Yell", the songs are structurally and lyrically similar. The former is about Idol orgasming, and a woman making him scream, while the latter is the other way around. He was more looking at continuing on than chart success when writing the song. Being a reintroduction for Idol, its message is him having no intentions to stop.

== Critical reception ==
Billboard noted the song and "Rat Race" weren't quite successful in "aping Nirvana's soft verse/howling chorus." antiMusic critic David E. Demarest states that "Scream" isn't his favorite song on the album, but is expected as the lead single, adding "it should be an easy pill to swallow for Idol fans, hard rocking and driven as it is, with plenty of Billy’s unique scream and twice that amount of attitude." Classic Rock History ranked the song #10 on their "Top 10 Billy Idol Songs" list, and write he delivers "a magnetic performance that bridges his punk roots with modern rock aesthetics."

== Appearances ==
The song was used in an episode of Viva La Bam, in which Idol also guest starred, where he and Bam Margera sing it as they go down the highway.

== Track listing ==
All tracks are written by Billy Idol and Brian Tichy.

| No. | Title | Length |
|---|---|---|
| 1. | "Scream" (Radio Edit) | 3:54 |
| 2. | "Scream" (Album Version) | 4:43 |
| 3. | "Bleeding Me Insane" | 4:35 |
| 4. | "Scream" (Call Out Hook) | 0:12 |

== Personnel ==
- Billy Idol – vocals
- Steve Stevens – guitar
- Stephen McGrath – bass guitar
- Derek Sherinian – keyboards
- Brian Tichy – percussion, drums
- Julian Beeston – drum programming
- Kevin Anderson – keyboards (uncredited)

== Charts ==
| Chart (2005) | Peak position |
|---|---|
| Germany | 54 |
| US Mainstream Rock (Billboard) | 26 |
