= The Scream (disambiguation) =

The Scream is a painting by Edvard Munch.

The Scream may also refer to:

- The Scream (album), a 1978 album by Siouxsie & the Banshees
- The Scream (band), a 1990s American hard rock band
- "The Scream", a 2021 song by the Cat Empire
- "The Scream", a song by Poison from the 1993 album Native Tongue
- The Scream, a 2006 novel by Rohinton Mistry
- The Scream, a 1988 novel by John Skipp and Craig Spector

== See also ==
- Scream (disambiguation)
- Wilhelm scream, an often-used film sound effect
