= Ice cream (disambiguation) =

Ice cream is a sweetened frozen dessert made from milk or sugar.

Ice Cream may also refer to:

== Film ==
- Ice Cream (1986 film), an Indian Malayalam-language film
- Ice Cream (1993 film), an American surrealist comedy short film
- Ice Cream (2014 film), an Indian Telugu-language film by Ram Gopal Varma
  - Ice Cream 2, a sequel to the 2014 film, released the same year
- Ice Cream (2015 film), an Indian Tulu-language film
- Ice Cream (2016 film), a Bangladeshi coming-of-age romantic drama film
- Ice Cream (2025 film), a Sri Lankan film

== Songs ==
- "Ice Cream" (Battles song), 2011
- "Ice Cream" (Blackpink and Selena Gomez song), 2020
- "Ice Cream" (Hyuna song), 2012
- "Ice Cream" (Raekwon song), 1995
- "Ice Cream" (Yuna song), 2026
- "Ice Cream" ("I Scream, You Scream, We All Scream for Ice Cream"), a 1927 novelty song
- "Ice Cream", by Baby Alice
- "Ice Cream", by f(x), from the 2010 EP Nu ABO
- "Ice Cream", by Lil Wayne from the 2009 album No Ceilings
- "Ice Cream", by Moka Only from the album Vermilion, 2007
- "Ice Cream", by Muscles, 2008
- "Ice Cream", by NYPC also known as New Young Pony Club, 2006
- "Ice Cream", by Sarah McLachlan, from the 1993 album Fumbling Towards Ecstasy
- "Ice Cream", by Twice from the 2017 album Twicecoaster: Lane 2
- "Ice Cream", by K.Flay from the 2019 album Solutions
- "Ice Cream", by Mika from the 2019 album My Name Is Michael Holbrook
- "Ice Cream", by Teenage Joans from the 2021 EP Taste of Me
- "Ice Cream", by TXT from the 2021 album The Chaos Chapter: Freeze

== Other uses ==
- Ice-Cream (footballer) (born 1987), Osa Guobadia, Nigerian footballer
- Ice Cream (mango), named mango cultivar originating in Trinidad and Tobago
- Chery QQ Ice Cream, a 2022– Chinese electric city car
- Ice Cream, a character in the animated series Adventure Time episode "Chips & Ice Cream"
- Ice Cream, a clothing brand from Billionaire Boys Club
- Ice Cream, nickname of Nigerian footballer Osa Guobadia (b. 1987)

== See also ==
- I Scream (disambiguation)
