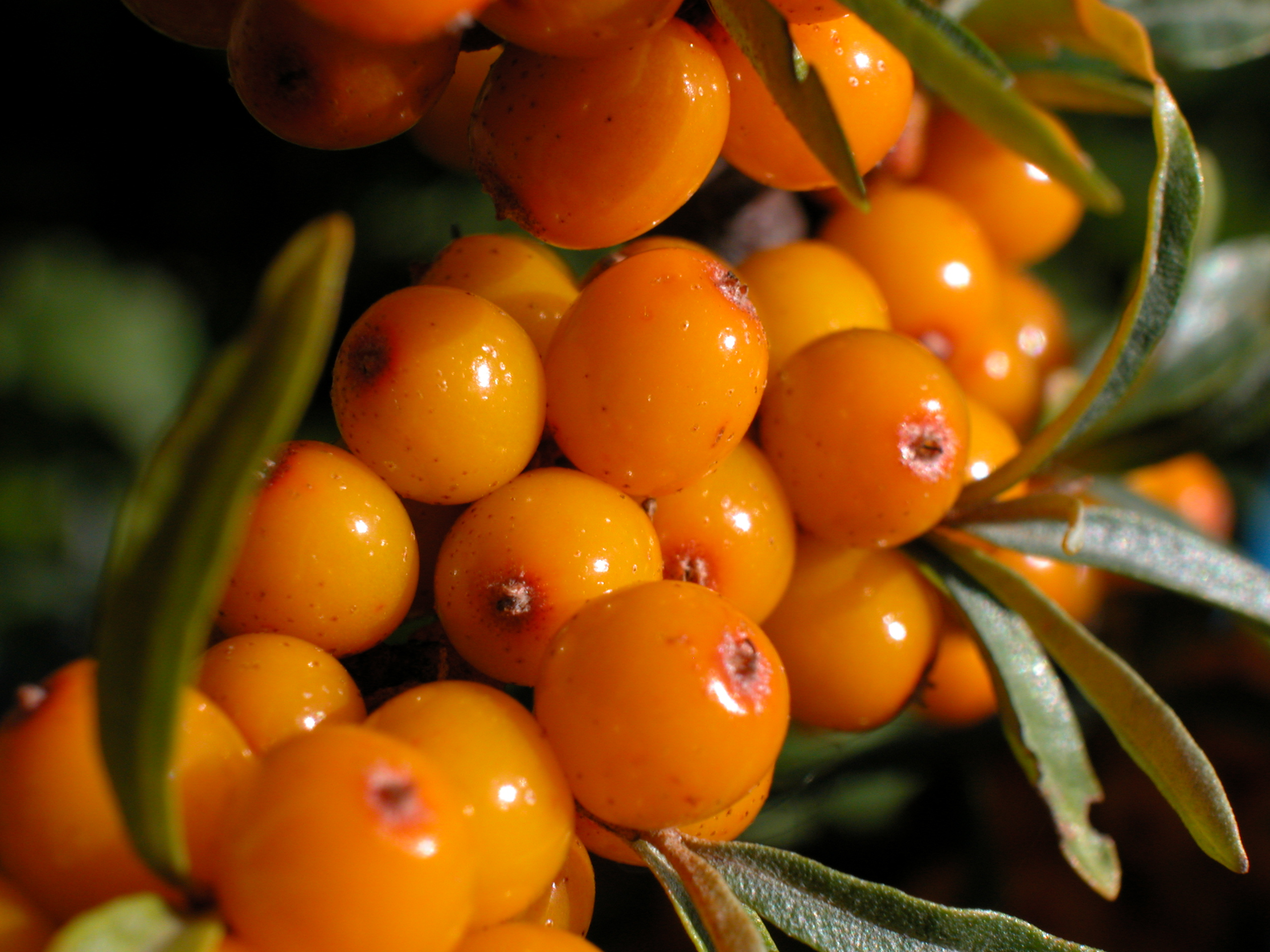

Scientific classification
- Kingdom: Plantae
- Clade: Tracheophytes
- Clade: Angiosperms
- Clade: Eudicots
- Clade: Rosids
- Order: Rosales
- Family: Elaeagnaceae; Juss. 1789

Type genus
- Elaeagnus L.

Genera
- Elaeagnus L.; Hippophae L.; Shepherdia Nutt.

Synonyms
- Hippophaeaceae G. Meyer

= Elaeagnaceae =

Family of flowering plants

The Elaeagnaceae are a plant family, the oleaster family, of the order Rosales comprising small trees and shrubs, native to temperate regions of the Northern Hemisphere, south into tropical Asia and Australia. The family has about 60 species in three genera.

They are commonly thorny, with simple leaves often coated with tiny scales or hairs. Most of the species are xerophytes (found in dry habitats); several are also halophytes, tolerating high levels of soil salinity.

The Elaeagnaceae often harbor nitrogen-fixing actinomycetes of the genus Frankia in root nodules, making them useful for soil reclamation. This characteristic, together with their production of plentiful seeds, often results in the Elaeagnaceae being regarded as weeds.

The stems and leaves are covered with silvery brown or golden hairs which are either peltate or scaly. Shepherdia and Hippophae are unisexual, the female and male borne on different plants (dioecious). There are no petals, the perianth comprising a single whorl of two to eight fused sepals. In the male flower the receptacle is often flat, while in the bisexual and female flowers it is tubular, there are four to eight stamens with free filaments and bilocular anthers. The ovary is superior with one carpel containing a single erect anatropous ovule. The style is long and bears a single stigma. The fruit is an achene or a drupe a fruit-like structure enclosed by the thickened lower part of the persistent calyx. It contains a single seed with little or no endosperm and a straight embryo with thick fleshy cotyledons. A number of species are grown as ornamental shrubs, notably Elaeagnus angustifolia (oleaster), Elaeagnus pungens, Elaeagnus umbellata and Elaeagnus macrophylla, which are mainly grown as deciduous or evergreen shrubs for their attractive foliage and Hippophae rhamnoides (sea buckthorn) is grown for its bright orange berries in autumn and winter. The fruits of a number of species are edible, for example, those of Shepherdia argentea (Silver Buffalo Berry). Its fruits are used as jelly and are also eaten dried with sugar in various parts of the United States and Canada. The berries of Shepherdia canadensis (Russet Buffalo Berry) when dried or smoked are used as food by Inuit, Yupik and Aleut peoples. The berries of Hippophae rhamnoides are made into a sauce in France and into jelly elsewhere. The wood of this species is fine-grained and is used for woodturning. The fruit of the Japanese shrub Elaeagnus multiflora (Cherry Elaeagnus) are used in preserves and are used in alcoholic beverage.

== Phylogeny ==
Modern molecular phylogenetics suggest the following relationships:

- - Rhamnaceae (outgroup)
  - Elaeagnaceae
    - Elaeagnus
    - - Shepherdia
      - Hippophae

== Fossil history ==
Fossil pollen of Elaeagnacites is described from the late Cretaceous (Santonian) of China and pollen similar to that of Elaeagnaceae is widespread in the Paleocene. There are pollen evidence of Elaeagnus from the upper Eocene Florissant Formation, Colorado, McGinitie's Wardell Ranch Flora locality in Colorado of middle to late middle Eocene and similar samples from the Washakie Basin Laney Shale Member of early Eocene. A fossil †Elaeagnus orchidioides flower is recorded from the late Pliocene of Willershausen (Kalefeld), Hesse, Germany. There are two fossil wood records with extensive documentation of anatomical features: †Elaeagnus semiannulipora from the early Miocene of Yamagata, Japan, and †EIeagnaceoxylon shepherdioides, considered similar to Shepherdia, from the Pliocene Beaufort Formation, northwestern Banks Island, Canada. Four fossil leaves have been described with diagnostic features of Elaeagnus from the late Miocene of eastern Tibet, modern altitude of 3910 m The silverberry genus Elaeagnus (Elaeagnaceae) reaches its greatest diversity (54 species) and endemism (36 species) in this area. The diversification of Elaeagnus in the Qinghai-Tibet Plateau and adjacent areas might have been driven by continuous uplift at least since the late Miocene, causing formation of complex topography and climate with high rainfall seasonality.
