= Scream (horror magazine) =

- Scream magazine issue #45
- Categories: Horror
- Frequency: Bi-monthly
- Founded: 2010
- Country: United Kingdom
- Website: www.screamhorrormag.com

Scream is an internationally distributed British horror film fan magazine which has been in publication since 2010. Published bi-monthly and featuring articles and photos about films, books, games, comics, graphic novels, and more, along with celebrity interviews and on-location film reports, the magazine claims to be "the world's number one print horror magazine".

== Publication ==
The first issue of Scream was published in October 2010, featuring a cover story on the Joe Johnston film The Wolfman. In 2014, Scream magazine launched iScream, which allows consumers to purchase issues of the magazine digitally. On 19 September 2016 the magazine became available at Barnes & Noble stores in the United States. Beyond its digital availability or its availability through a subscription, issues of the magazine are carried by Barnes & Noble and Books-A-Million in the United States, Chapters in Canada, Eason & Son in Ireland, and WHSmith in the United Kingdom.

== See also ==
- Famous Monsters of Filmland
- Fangoria
- Rue Morgue (magazine)
