= Eskimo (ice cream) =

Ice cream brand of Nicaragua

Eskimo SA
- Industry: Food Processing
- Founded: Managua, Nicaragua (1942)
- Founder: Mario Salvo; Josefina Horvilleur
- Headquarters: Managua, Nicaragua
- Products: Ice cream
- Number of employees: 810
- Website: www.eskimo.com.ni

Eskimo is a national ice cream chain from Managua, Nicaragua. It is a subsidiary of Grupo Lala since 2014.

== History ==
The couple Mario Salvo and Josefina Horvilleur, daughter of a French immigrant, founded the company in 1942 as a small business operating from their home in the city of Managua. Ten years later, as the business grew, Salvo imported half dozen ice cream carts from England in order to improve the distribution chain.

With the triumph of the Sandinista revolution in July 1979, Eskimo was expropriated by the state. The company returned to the Salvo family in the nineties and in 1992 Eskimo started expanding to the rest of Central America.

Currently, the company produces 5,300 tons of ice cream and exports to Honduras, El Salvador and Costa Rica.
