= Elaeagnus × reflexa =

Scientific classification
- Kingdom: Plantae
- Clade: Tracheophytes
- Clade: Angiosperms
- Clade: Eudicots
- Clade: Rosids
- Order: Rosales
- Family: Elaeagnaceae
- Genus: Elaeagnus
- Species: E. × reflexa

Binomial name
- Elaeagnus × reflexa É.Morren & Decne.

Species of plant

Elaeagnus × reflexa is a species of flowering plant. It is a hybrid between Elaeagnus glabra and E. pungens.

== Description ==
A small bush with alternate tapering leaves and red berries.

== Range ==
It is found in Japan, and has been introduced to Australia and New Zealand.

It is considered a weed in New Zealand.

== Taxonomy ==
Elaeagnus × reflexa is described as Elaeagnus reflexa.
