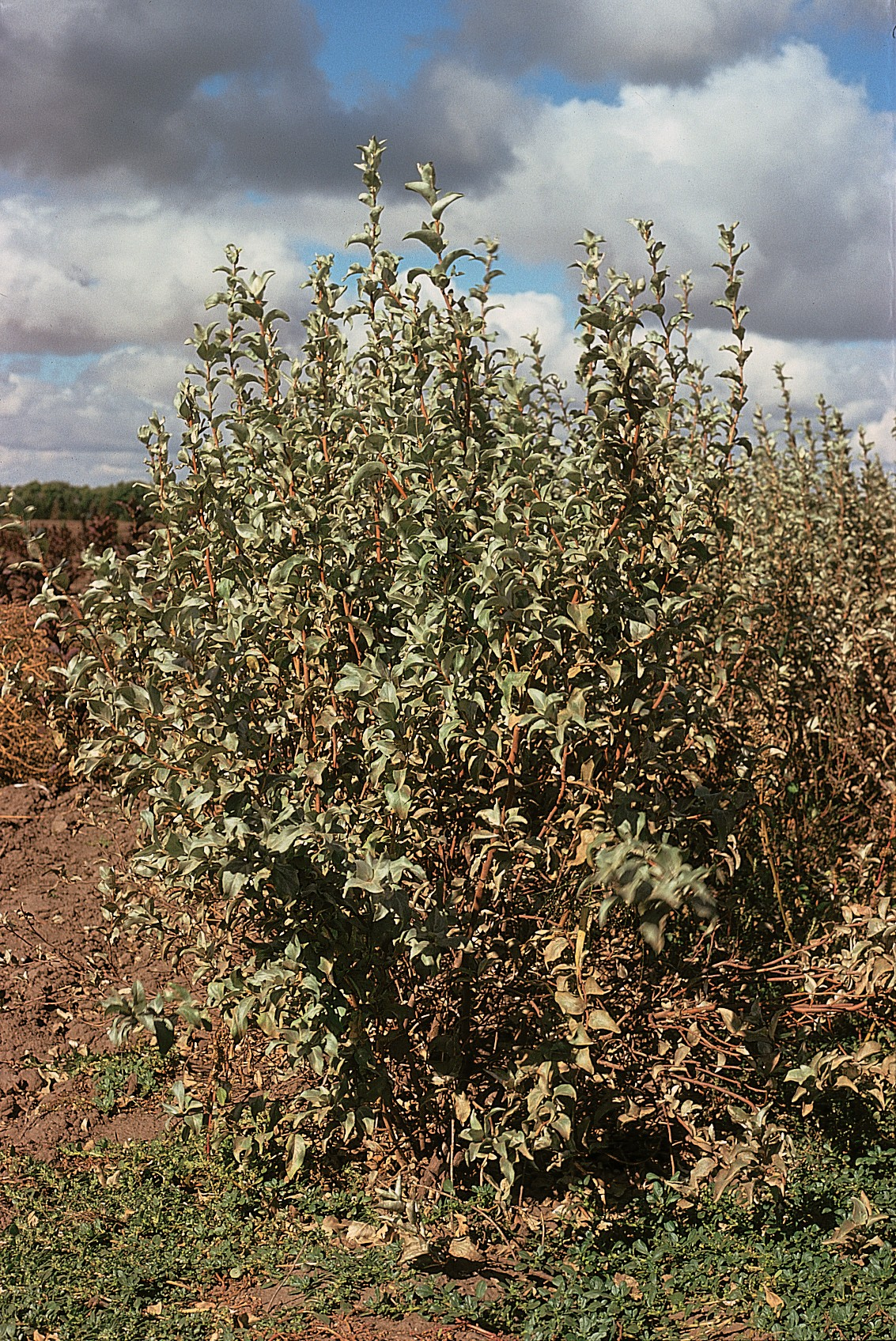
- American silverberry (Elaeagnus commutata)

Scientific classification
- Kingdom: Plantae
- Clade: Tracheophytes
- Clade: Angiosperms
- Clade: Eudicots
- Clade: Rosids
- Order: Rosales
- Family: Elaeagnaceae
- Genus: Elaeagnus; Tourn. ex L.

Species
- See text

Synonyms
- Octarillum Lour.

= Elaeagnus =

Genus of flowering plants in the family Elaeagnaceae

Elaeagnus is a genus of about 90 species of flowering plants in the family Elaeagnaceae. Species of the genus are commonly known as silverberry or oleaster.

== Description ==
Elaeagnus plants are deciduous or evergreen shrubs or small trees. The alternate leaves and the shoots are usually covered with tiny silvery to brownish scales, giving the plants a whitish to grey-brown colour from a distance. The flowers are small, with a four-lobed calyx and no petals; they are often fragrant. The fruit is a fleshy drupe containing a single seed; it is edible in many species. Several species are cultivated for their fruit, including E. angustifolia, E. umbellata, and E. multiflora (gumi). E. umbellata contains the carotenoid lycopene.

== Taxonomy ==
The genus Elaeagnus was erected in 1754 by Carl Linnaeus, who attributed the name to Joseph Pitton de Tournefort. There is agreement that the name is based on Theophrastus's use of the Ancient Greek word ἐλαίαγνος (elaíagnos, latinized to elaeagnus) as the name of a shrub. The first part of the name, elae-, is from ἐλαία, 'olive'. Sources differ on the origin of the second part: it may be from ἄγνος, Vitex agnus-castus, the chaste tree, or from the Greek name for a kind of willow. In either case, the second part is derived from ἁγνός (hagnós), meaning 'pure', 'chaste'.

=== Species ===
As of December 2025, Plants of the World Online accepts the following 93 species and three hybrids:

- Elaeagnus angustata (Rehder) C.Y.Chang
- Elaeagnus angustifolia L.
- Elaeagnus annamensis S.Moore
- Elaeagnus arakiana Koidz.
- Elaeagnus argyi H.Lév.
- Elaeagnus bambusetorum Hand.-Mazz.
- Elaeagnus bockii Diels
- Elaeagnus bonii Lecomte
- Elaeagnus calcarea Z.R.Xu
- Elaeagnus caudata Schltdl. ex Momiy.
- Elaeagnus cinnamomifolia W.K.Hu & H.F.Chow
- Elaeagnus commutata Bernh. ex Rydb.
- Elaeagnus conferta Roxb.
- Elaeagnus courtoisii Belval
- Elaeagnus darenensis S.S.Ying
- Elaeagnus davidi Franch.
- Elaeagnus delavayi Lecomte
- Elaeagnus difficilis Servett.
- Elaeagnus elongatus Tagane & V.S.Dang
- Elaeagnus epitricha Momiy. ex H.Ohba
- Elaeagnus fasciculata Griff.
- Elaeagnus formosana Nakai
- Elaeagnus formosensis Hatus.
- Elaeagnus geniculata D.Fang
- Elaeagnus glabra Thunb.
- Elaeagnus gonyanthes Benth.
- Elaeagnus grandifolia Hayata
- Elaeagnus griffithii Servett.
- Elaeagnus grijsii Hance
- Elaeagnus guizhouensis C.Y.Chang
- Elaeagnus henryi Warb. ex Diels
- Elaeagnus heterophylla D.Fang & D.R.Liang
- Elaeagnus hunanensis C.J.Qi & Q.Z.Lin
- Elaeagnus indica Servett.
- Elaeagnus infundibularis Momiy.
- Elaeagnus jiangxiensis C.Y.Chang
- Elaeagnus jingdonensis C.Y.Chang
- Elaeagnus kanaii Momiy.
- Elaeagnus lanceolata Warb.
- Elaeagnus lanpingensis C.Y.Chang
- Elaeagnus laosensis Lecomte
- Elaeagnus latifolia L.
- Elaeagnus lipoensis Z.R.Xu
- Elaeagnus liukiuensis Rehder
- Elaeagnus liuzhouensis C.Y.Chang
- Elaeagnus longiloba C.Y.Chang
- Elaeagnus loureiroi Champ.
- Elaeagnus luoxiangensis C.Y.Chang
- Elaeagnus luxiensis C.Y.Chang
- Elaeagnus macrantha Rehder
- Elaeagnus macrophylla Thunb.
- Elaeagnus magna (Servett.) Rehder
- Elaeagnus matsunoana Makino
- Elaeagnus maximowiczii Servett.
- Elaeagnus micrantha C.Y.Chang
- Elaeagnus mollis Diels
- Elaeagnus montana Makino
- Elaeagnus multiflora Thunb.
- Elaeagnus murakamiana Makino
- Elaeagnus numajiriana Makino
- Elaeagnus obovatifolia D.Fang
- Elaeagnus oldhamii Maxim.
- Elaeagnus ovata Servett.
- Elaeagnus pallidiflora C.Y.Chang
- Elaeagnus pilostyla C.Y.Chang
- Elaeagnus pingnanensis C.Y.Chang
- Elaeagnus pungens Thunb.
- Elaeagnus pyriformis Hook.f.
- Elaeagnus retrostyla C.Y.Chang
- Elaeagnus rivularis Merr.
- Elaeagnus rotundata Nakai
- Elaeagnus s-stylata Z.R.Xu
- Elaeagnus sarmentosa Rehder
- Elaeagnus schlechtendalii Servett.
- Elaeagnus stellipila Rehder
- Elaeagnus takeshitae Makino
- Elaeagnus taliensis C.Y.Chang
- Elaeagnus tarokoensis S.Y.Lu & Yuen P.Yang
- Elaeagnus thunbergii Servett.
- Elaeagnus tonkinensis Servett.
- Elaeagnus tricholepis Momiy.
- Elaeagnus triflora Roxb.
- Elaeagnus tubiflora C.Y.Chang
- Elaeagnus tutcheri Dunn
- Elaeagnus umbellata Thunb.
- Elaeagnus viridis Servett.
- Elaeagnus wenshanensis C.Y.Chang
- Elaeagnus xichouensis C.Y.Chang
- Elaeagnus xingwenensis C.Y.Chang
- Elaeagnus xizangensis C.Y.Chang
- Elaeagnus yakusimensis Masam.
- Elaeagnus yoshinoi Makino
- Elaeagnus yunnanensis Servett.

=== Accepted hybrids ===
- Elaeagnus × maritima Koidz.
- Elaeagnus × reflexa É.Morren & Decne.
- Elaeagnus × submacrophylla Servett.

=== Species names with uncertain taxonomic status ===
The status of the following species is unresolved:

- Elaeagnus asakawana Sa.Kurata
- Elaeagnus cyanea Aiton ex Steud.
- Elaeagnus emarginata Colla
- Elaeagnus fruticosa (Lour.) A.Chev.
- Elaeagnus fusca Pépin ex Lem.
- Elaeagnus laetevirens Lindb.
- Elaeagnus nagasakiana Nakai
- Elaeagnus oleaster L.
- Elaeagnus × pyramidalis Browicz & Bugala (E. commutata × E. multiflora)

== Habitat ==
The vast majority of the species are native to temperate and subtropical regions of Asia. Elaeagnus triflora extends from Asia south into northeastern Australia, while E. commutata is native to North America, and Elaeagnus philippinensis is native to the Philippines. One of the Asian species, E. angustifolia, may also be native in southeasternmost Europe, though it may instead be an early human introduction there. Also, several Asiatic species of Elaeagnus have become established as introduced species in North America, with some of these species being considered invasive, or even designated as noxious, in portions of the United States.

== Ecology ==
Elaeagnus species are used as food plants by the larvae of some Lepidoptera species including Coleophora elaeagnisella and the Gothic moths. The thorny shrubs can also provide good nesting sites for birds.

=== Nitrogen fixation ===
Many Elaeagnus species harbor nitrogen-fixing organisms in their roots, so are able to grow well in low-nitrogen soils. This ability results in multiple ecological consequences where these Elaeagnus species are present. They can become invasive in many locations where they are established as exotic species. Two species (E. pungens and E. umbellata) are currently rated as category II noxious, invasive species in many world regions and by the Florida Exotic Pest Plant Council.

== Cultivation ==
Elaeagnus species are widely cultivated for their showy, often variegated, foliage, and numerous cultivars and hybrids have been developed.

The fruit is acidic and somewhat astringent. It makes good tarts.

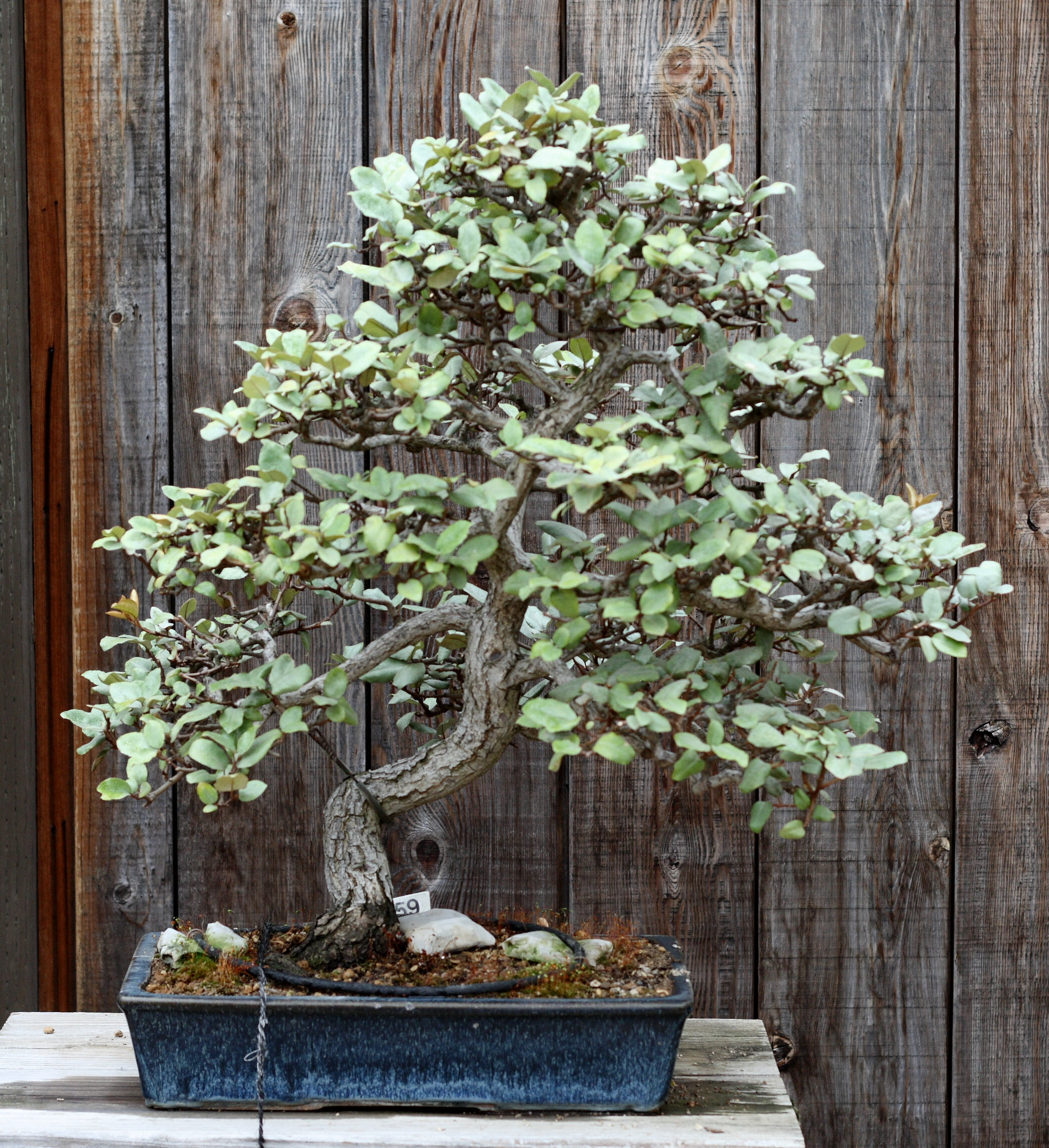
E. angustifolia cultivated as bonsai

Notable species and hybrids in cultivation include:-

- Elaeagnus angustifolia
- Elaeagnus commutata
- Elaeagnus macrophylla
- Elaeagnus multiflora
- Elaeagnus pungens
- Elaeagnus × reflexa
- Elaeagnus × submacrophylla (syn. E. × ebbingei)
- Elaeagnus umbellata

The hybrid Elaeagnus × submacrophylla and the cultivar 'Gilt Edge' have gained the Royal Horticultural Society's Award of Garden Merit.

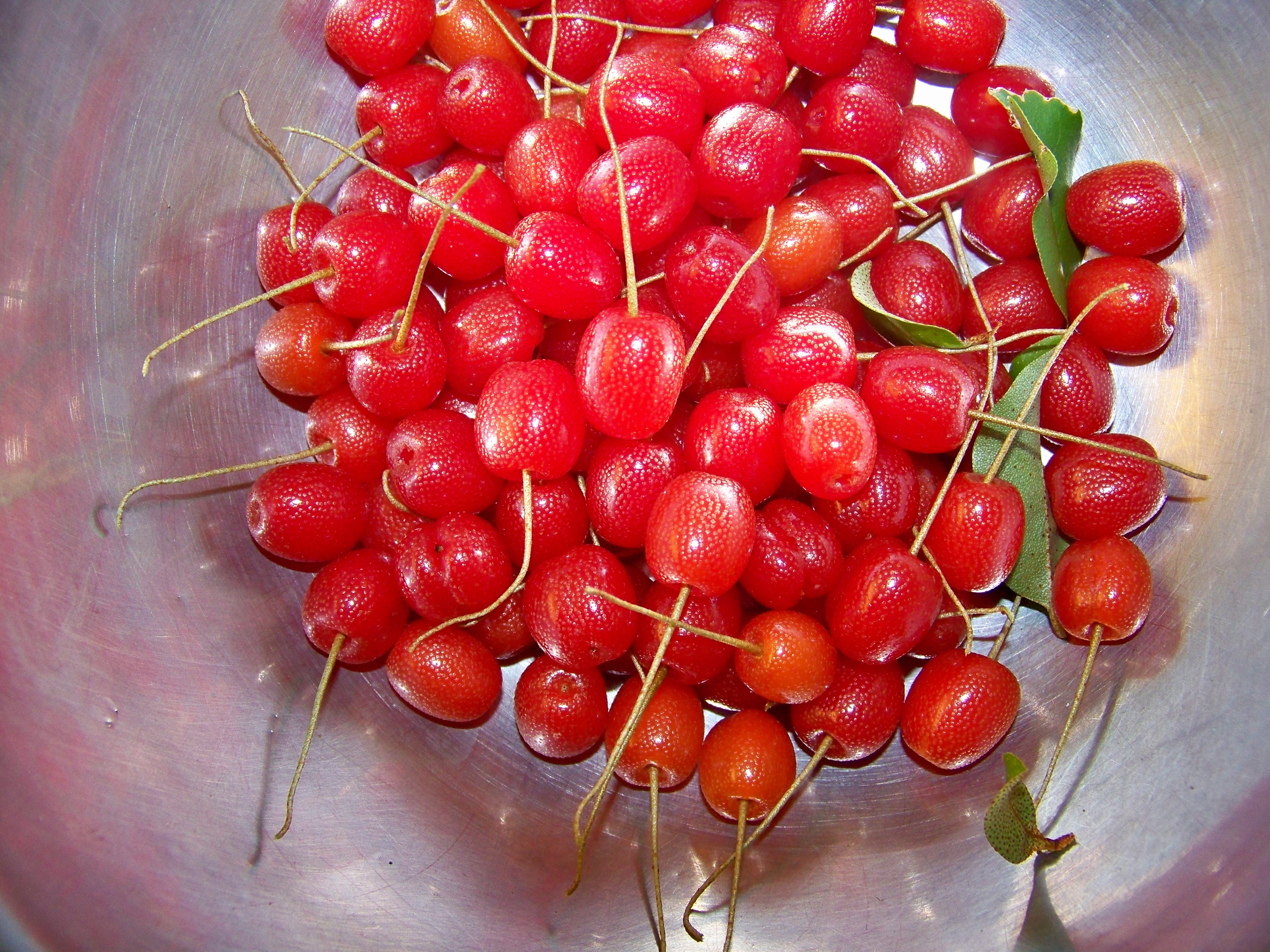
Berries from a large-fruited cultivar

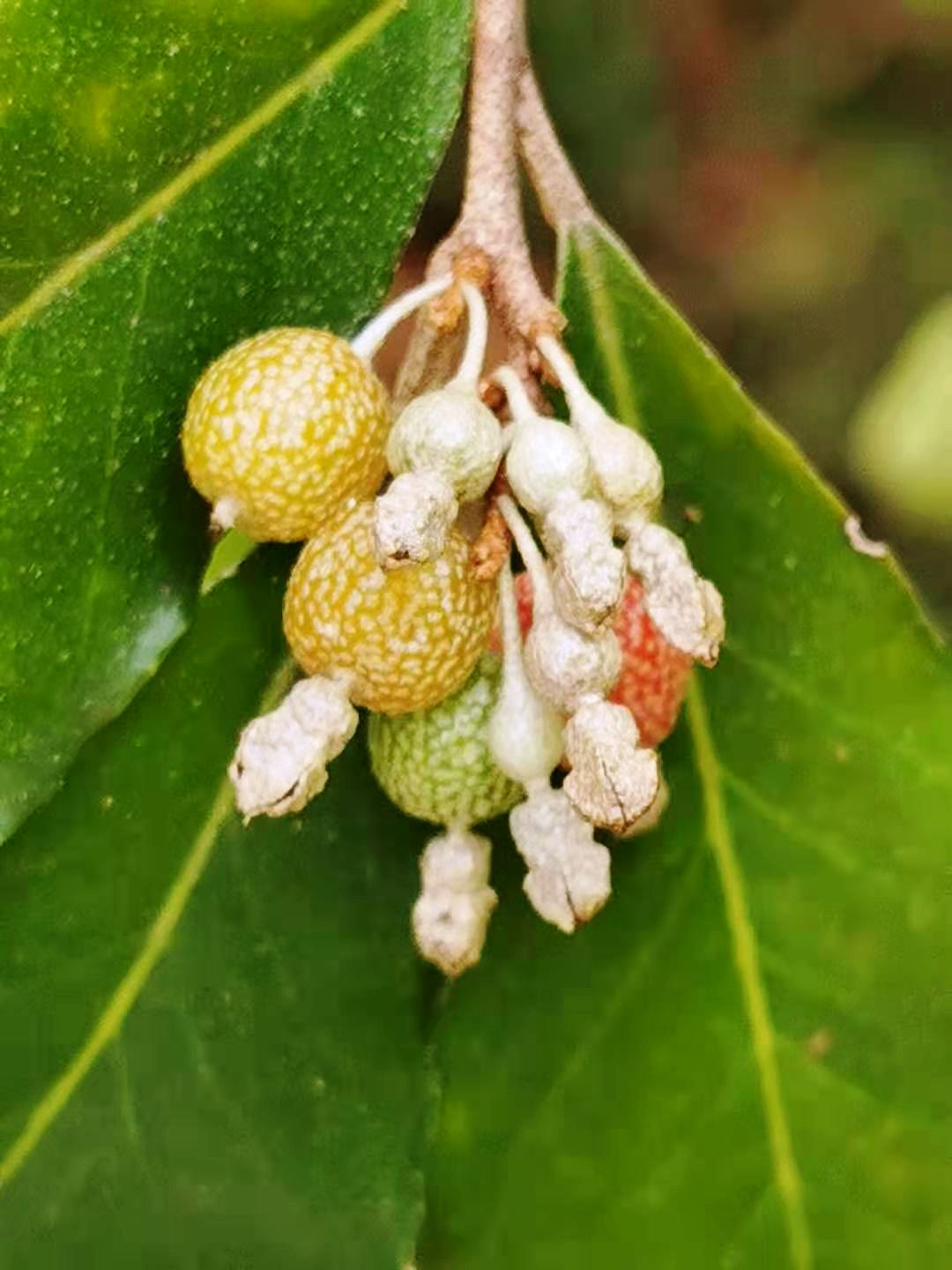
Elaeagnus oldhamii
