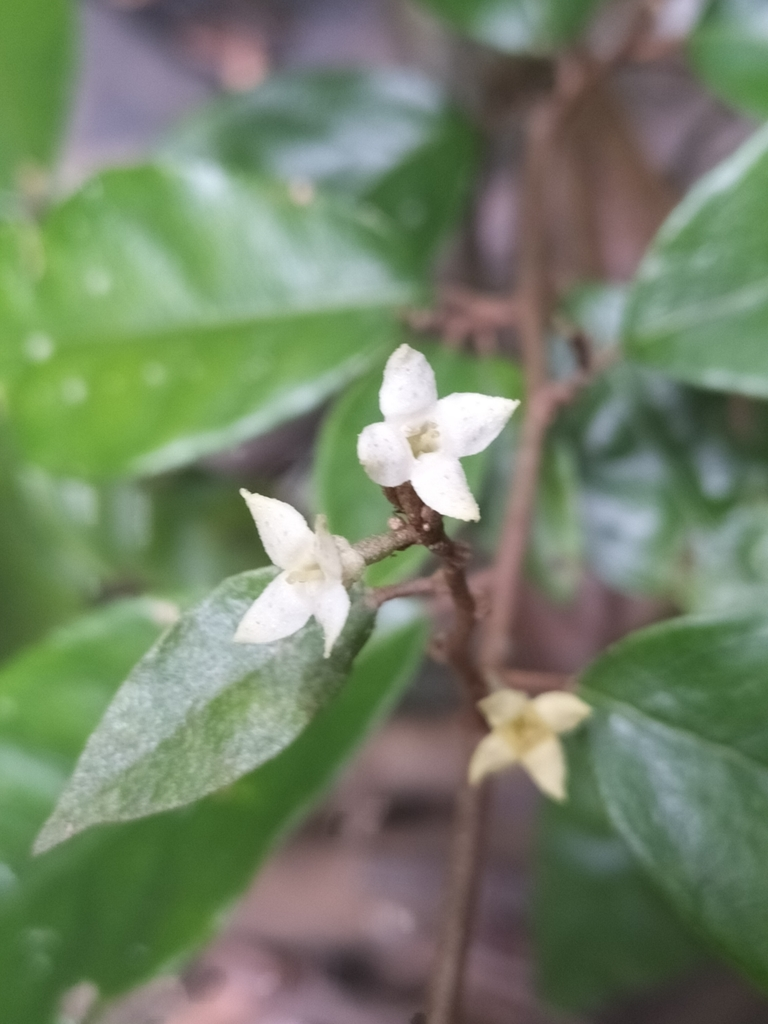

Conservation status
- Least Concern (NCA)

Scientific classification
- Kingdom: Plantae
- Clade: Tracheophytes
- Clade: Angiosperms
- Clade: Eudicots
- Clade: Rosids
- Order: Rosales
- Family: Elaeagnaceae
- Genus: Elaeagnus
- Species: E. triflora

Binomial name
- Elaeagnus triflora Roxb.

Synonyms
- Elaeagnus latifolia var. triflora (Roxb.) Schltdl.

= Elaeagnus triflora =

Australian bush tucker plant

Elaeagnus triflora, commonly known as millaa millaa vine, is a scrambling shrub the family Elaeagnaceae. Its native range is Malesia and Papuasia, to Taiwan in the north and the Australian state of Queensland in the south.

== Description ==
Elaeagnus triflora is a scandent shrub or vine with a stem diameter of up to 8 cm (3.1 in). The leaves are simple and can grow to 13 cm (5.1 in) long and 6 cm (2.4 in) wide. They are green and punctate above and the underside is covered with minute scales which give them a metallic silver or coppery colour. They have five to eight lateral veins either side of the midrib.

Flowers are either solitary or in groups of three on a raceme, and they occur in the leaf axils. They are fragrant and measure up to about 9 mm (0.4 in) long, with four pale yellow, pointed petals.

The fruit is red, ellipsoidal and about 17 mm (0.7 in) long, and contains a single seed about 15 mm (0.6 in) long and 6 mm (0.2 in) wide. It is edible.

== Gallery ==
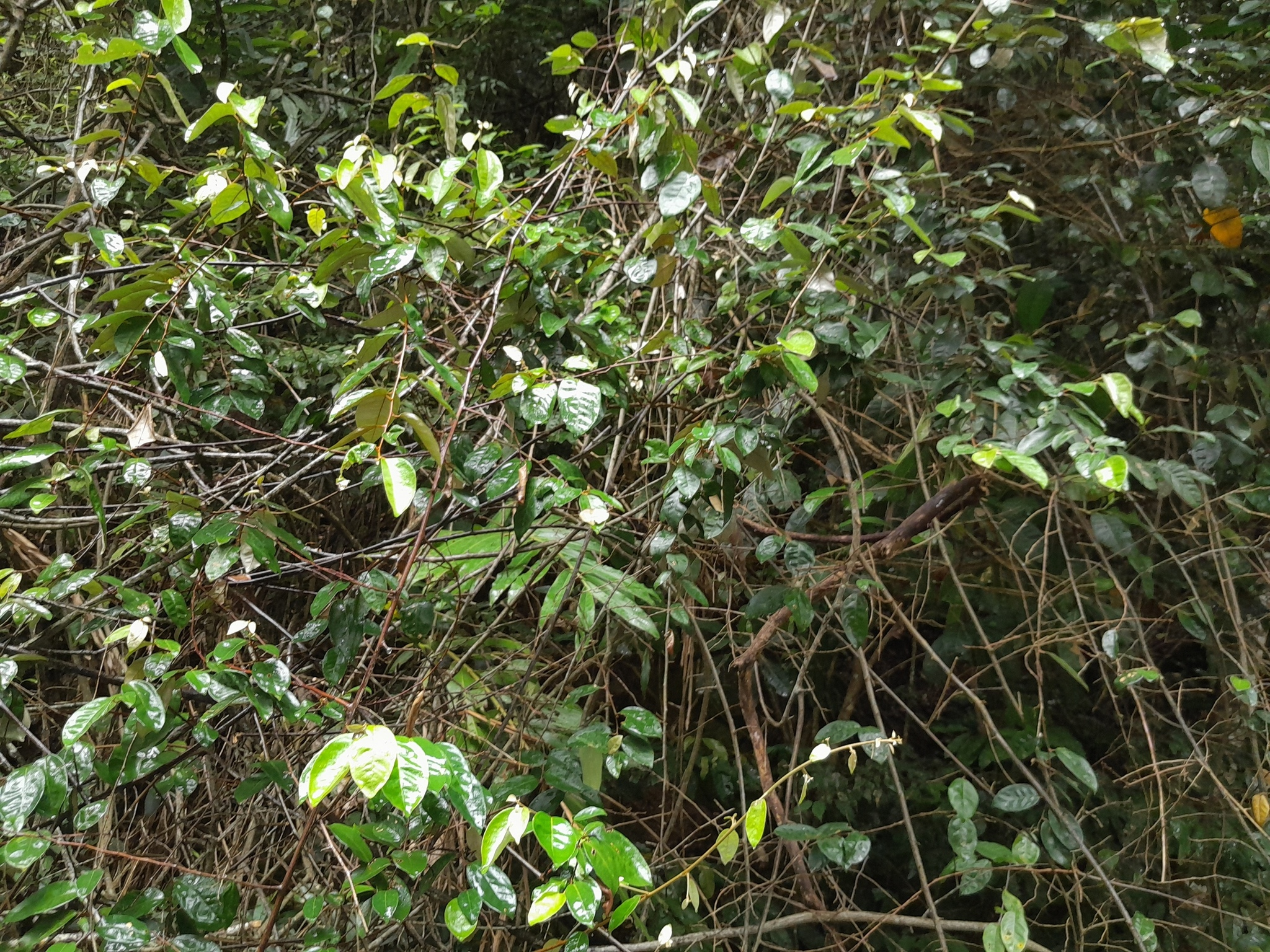
Habit

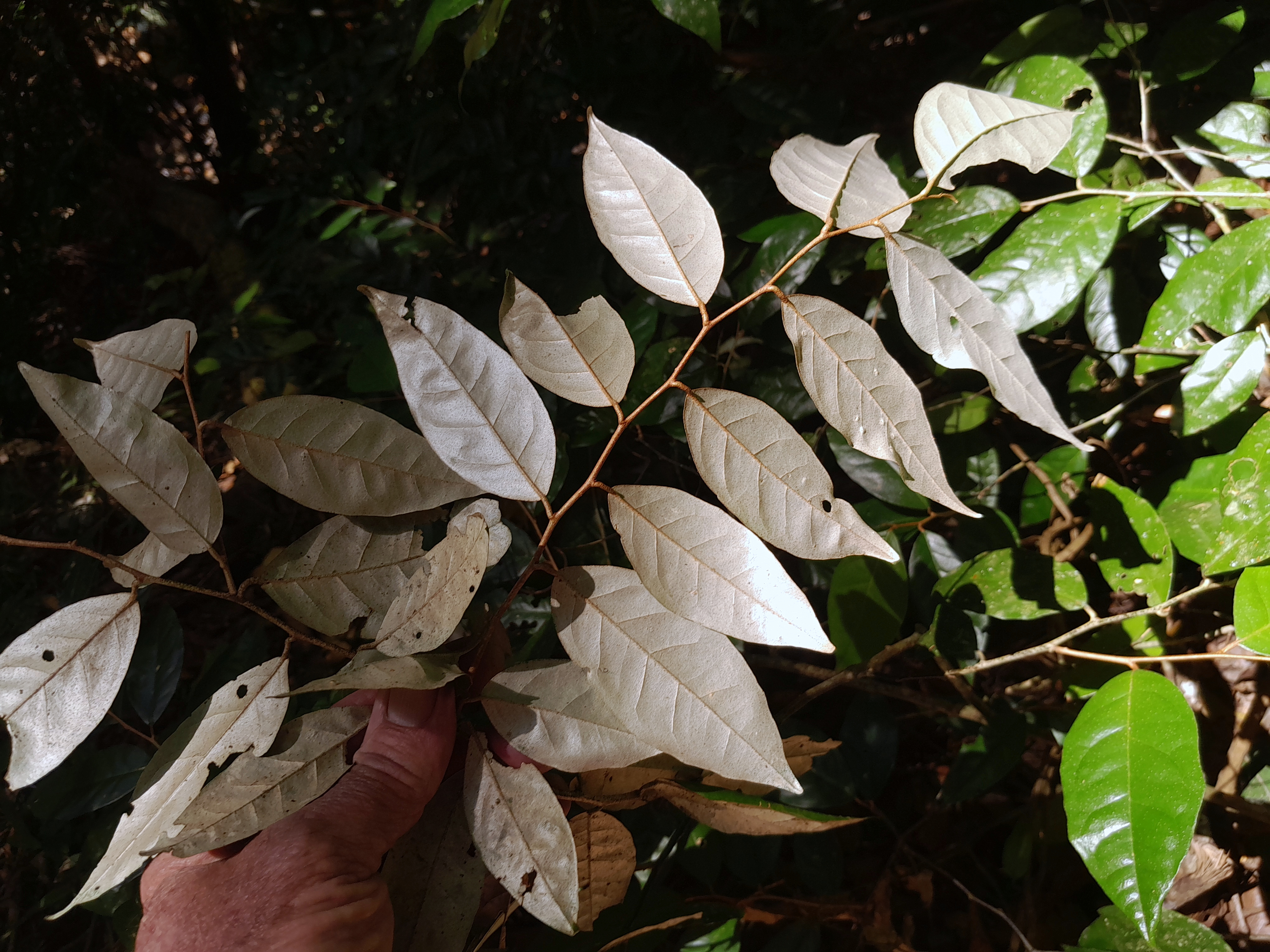
Leaf underside

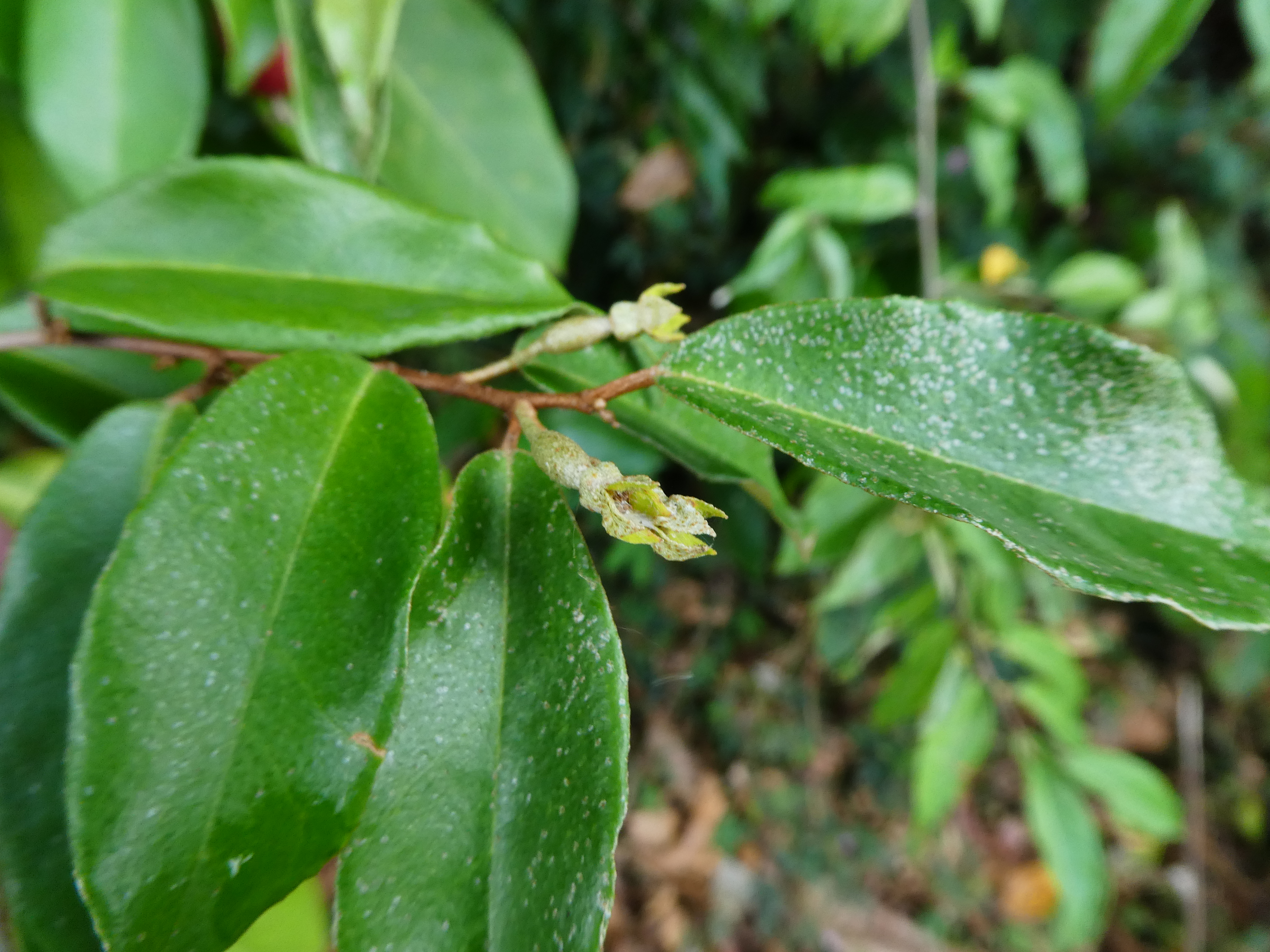
Flowers

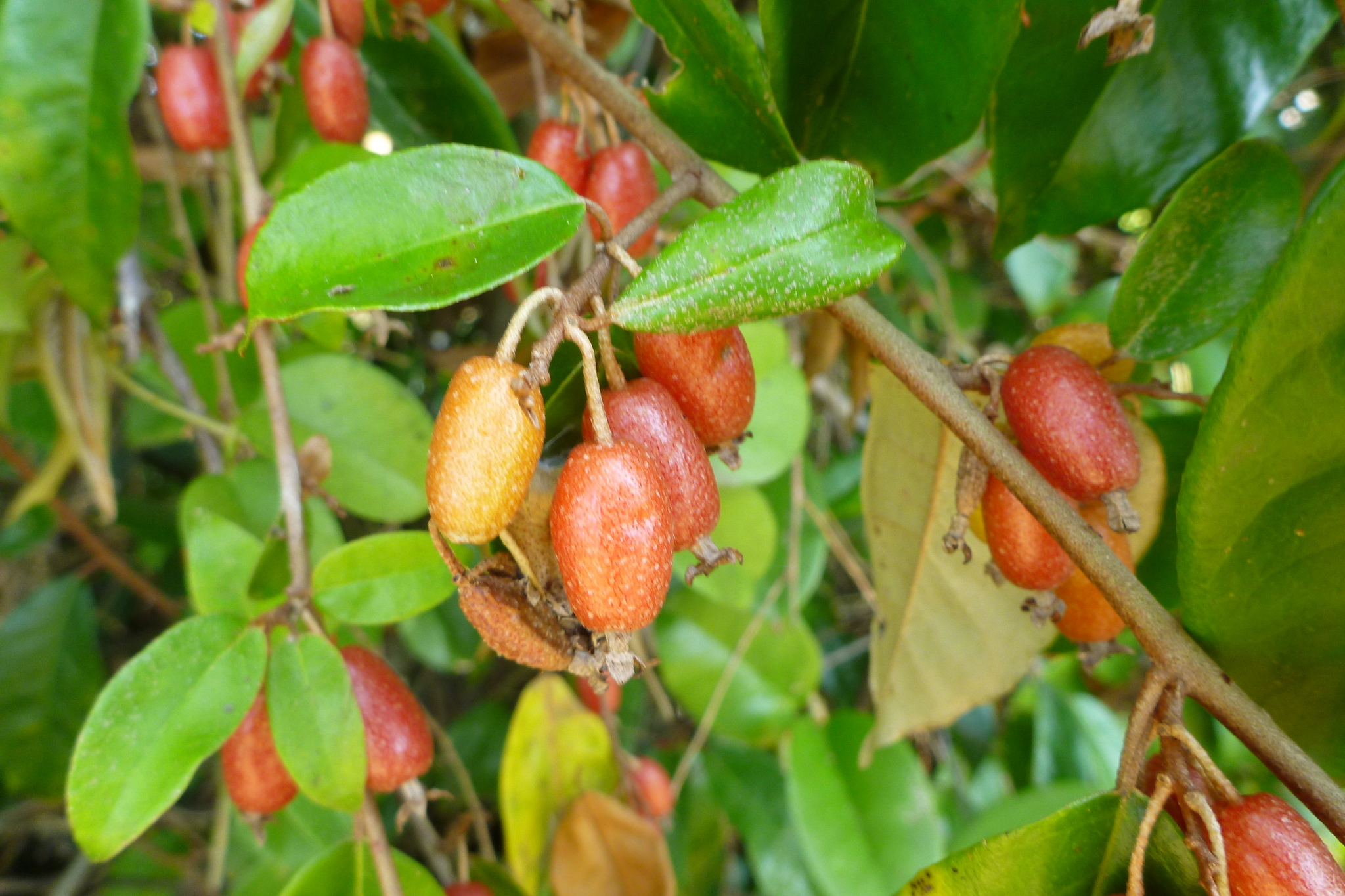
Fruit
