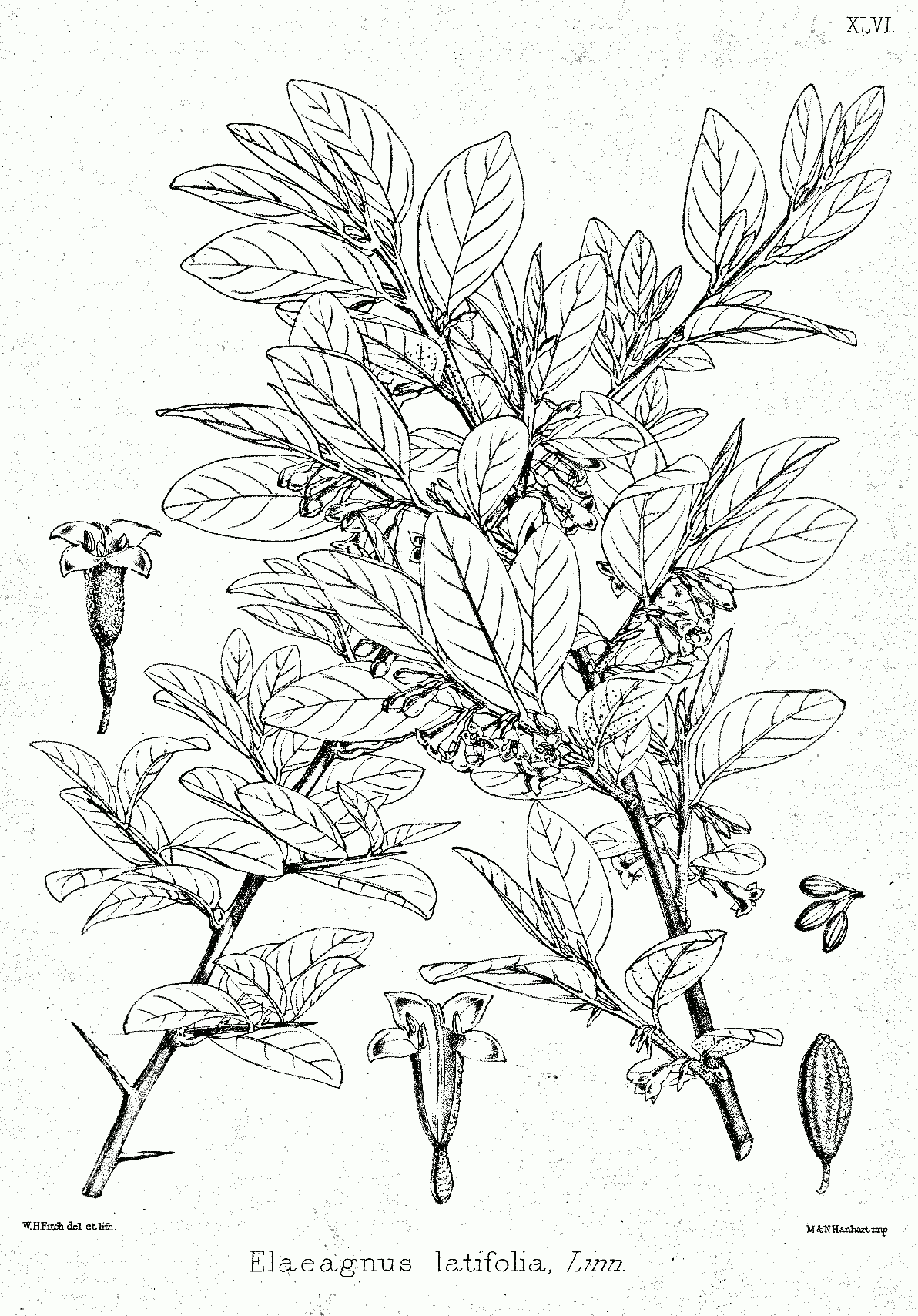
- Botanical illustration

Scientific classification
- Kingdom: Plantae
- Clade: Tracheophytes
- Clade: Angiosperms
- Clade: Eudicots
- Clade: Rosids
- Order: Rosales
- Family: Elaeagnaceae
- Genus: Elaeagnus
- Species: E. latifolia

Binomial name
- Elaeagnus latifolia L.

= Elaeagnus latifolia =

Species of flowering plant

Elaeagnus latifolia, known as the bastard oleaster, or soh-shang, is a species of Elaeagnus native to India and Southeast Asia.

== Description ==
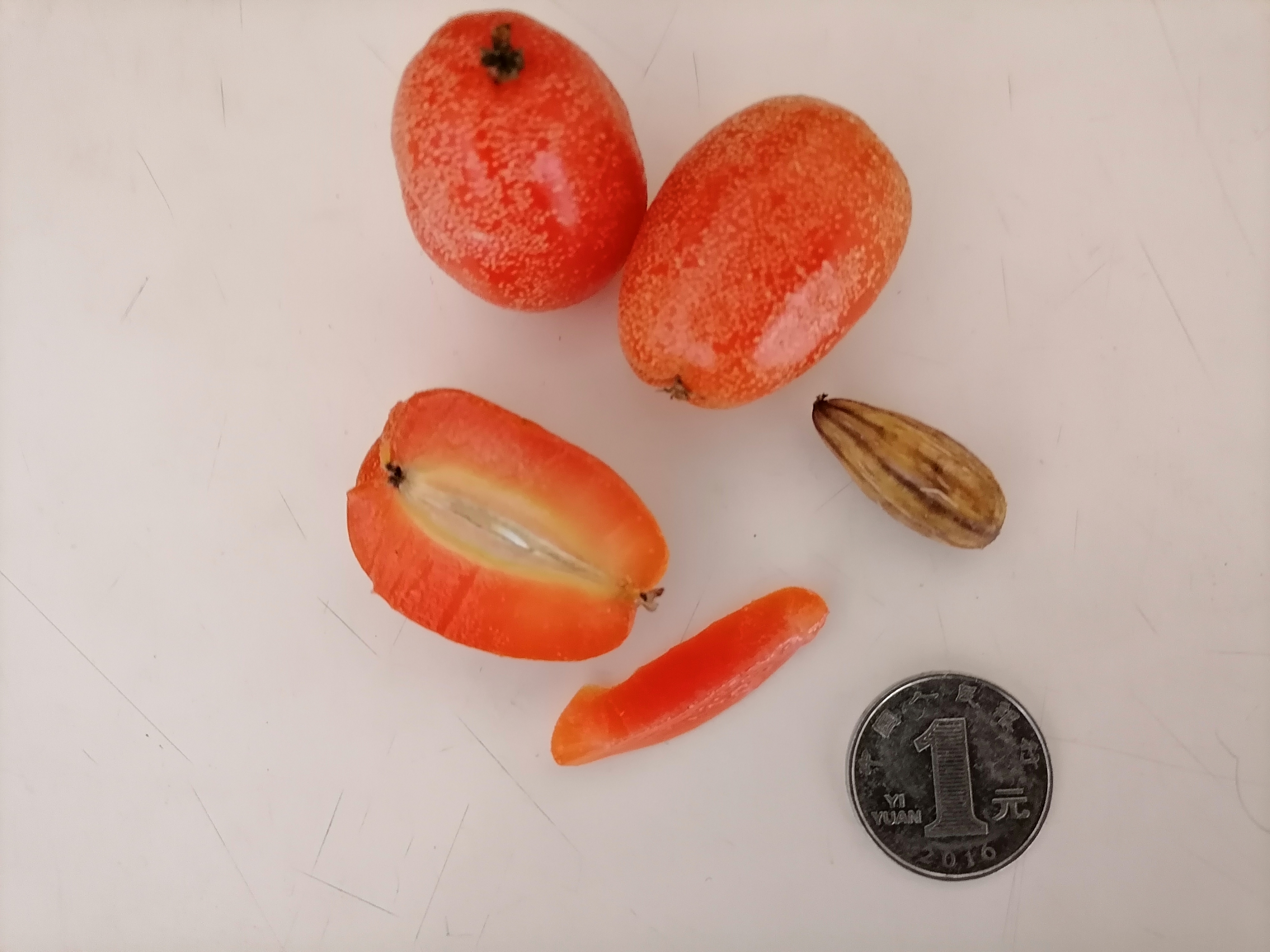
Bastard oleaster fruit and seed

Elaeagnus latifolia is an evergreen shrub that can grow up to ten feet tall. It has alternate pinnately compound leaves. The plant gives off a dark pink or bright red and speckled berry, oblong in shape and around the size of a grape or 75 cm (29.5 in) in diameter.

The fruit has a light orange colour. It is among the largest of the genre, at about 3.6cm long by 2.8 diameter The ripe fruit is pulpy with a sweet and slightly sour taste. and it contains several "good" fatty acids, and was investigated for possible use against cancer. It stays on the tree for only for a short time of 4–5 weeks between September and October (Basumatary et al. 2020). It is used for making chutney, jam, jelly and refreshing drinks.

== Habitat ==
E. latifolia is widely distributed from south-eastern Asia to the slopes of the Himalayas. It is also found in northeast India, Thailand, and Vietnam.

They inhabit dense swamps at about 1,500 feet above sea level in the Himalayas as well as dwelling in vast forest openings in Nepal. It is suitable for growing in moist soil with any pH value and can also adapt to growing in regions where the soil is dry. Since E. latifolia can thrive in both moist and dry conditions, it can tolerate the most intense droughts. E. latifolia shares a symbiotic relationship with soil-dwelling bacteria that perform nitrogen fixation. It is hardy to UK zone 9.

== Cultivation ==
The cultivation of Elaeagnus latifolia is mostly done in well drained soils. E. latifolia prefers soil that is moderately fertile which causes it to succeed in poor soils and dry soils. E. latifolia requires to grow in a position where there is plenty of sunlight. Outside of the native regions, E. latifolia is also cultivated in United Kingdom, however it is unlikely to succeed outdoors in the milder areas of the country. E. latifolia is known to be resistant to honey fungus. It may be grown in orchards where it may increase yield from the fruit trees.
