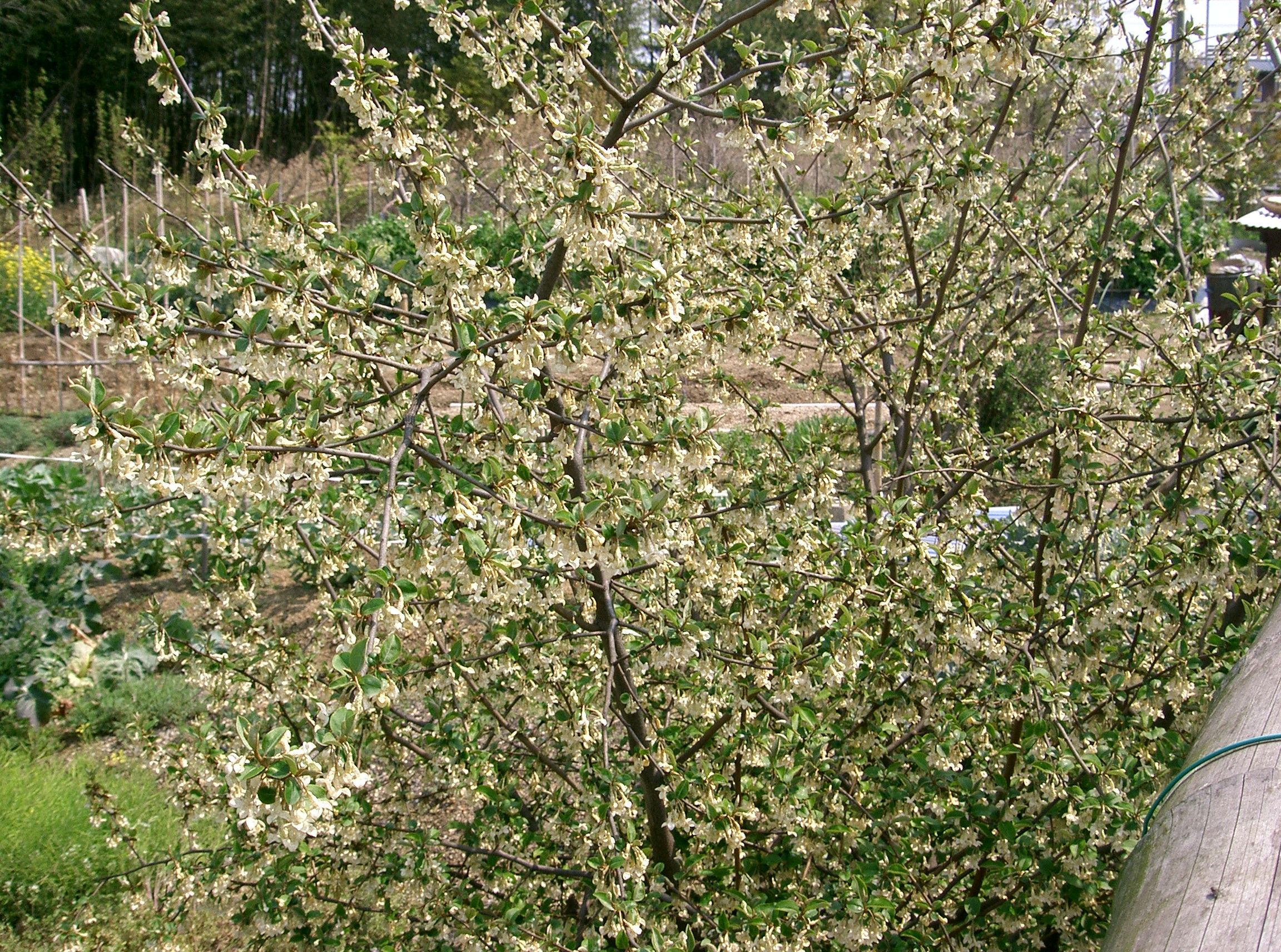

Scientific classification
- Kingdom: Plantae
- Clade: Tracheophytes
- Clade: Angiosperms
- Clade: Eudicots
- Clade: Rosids
- Order: Rosales
- Family: Elaeagnaceae
- Genus: Elaeagnus
- Species: E. multiflora

Binomial name
- Elaeagnus multiflora Thunb., 1784

= Elaeagnus multiflora =

Species of flowering plant

Elaeagnus multiflora, the cherry elaeagnus, cherry silverberry, goumi, gumi, or natsugumi, is a species of Elaeagnus native to China, Korea, Japan and the Russian Far East (Sakhalin).

== Description ==
Elaeagnus multiflora is a deciduous or semi-evergreen shrub or small tree growing to 2–8 m (6 ft 7 in – 26 ft 3 in) tall, with a trunk up to 30 cm (12 in) diameter with dark brown bark. The shoots are densely covered in minute red-brown scales. The leaves are ovate to elliptic, 3–10 cm (1.2–3.9 in) long and 2–5 cm (0.79–1.97 in) broad, green above, and silvery to orange-brown below with dense small scales.

The flowers are solitary or in pairs in the leaf axils, fragrant, with a four-lobed pale yellowish-white corolla 1.5 cm (0.59 in) long; flowering is in mid-spring.

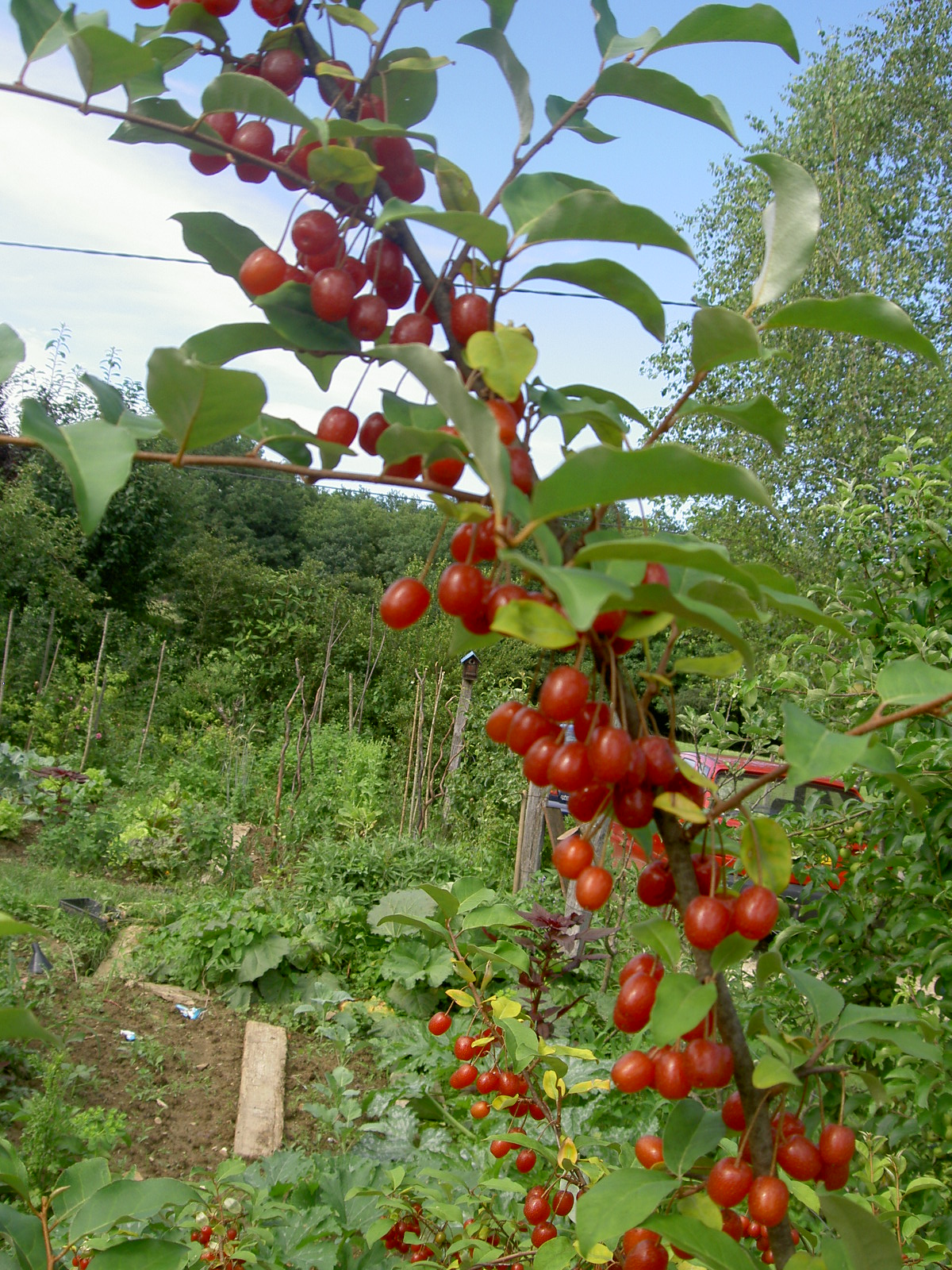
Fruits of Elaeagnus multiflora in mid June

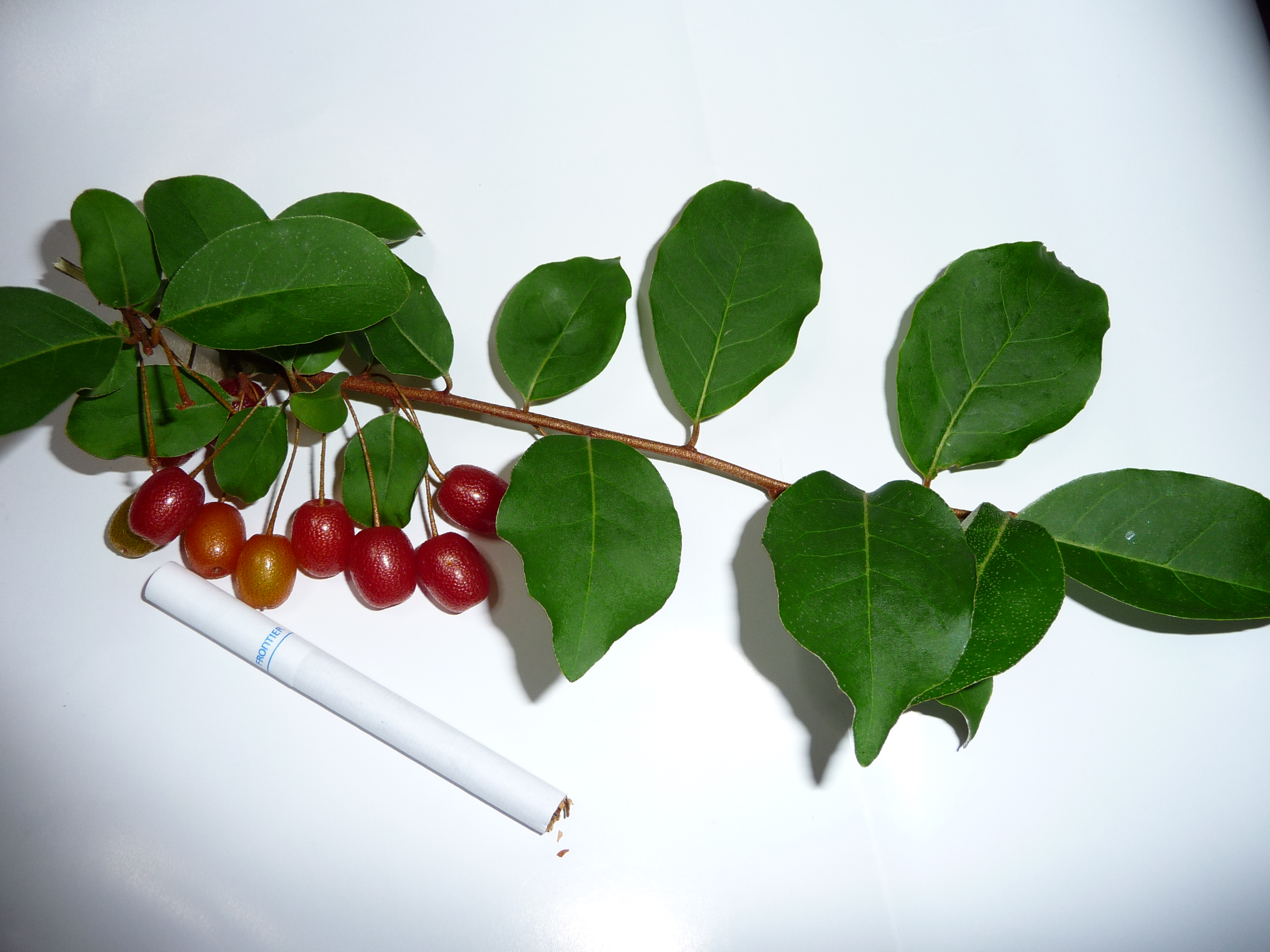
Japanese Elaeagnus multiflora var. hortensis, with cigarette for scale.

The fruit is a round to oval drupe 1 cm (0.39 in) long, silvery-scaled orange, ripening red dotted with silver or brown, pendulous on a 2–3 cm (0.79–1.18 in) peduncle. When ripe in mid- to late summer, the fruit is juicy and edible, with a sweet but astringent taste somewhat similar to that of rhubarb. The skin of the fruit is thin and fragile, making it difficult to transport, thus reducing its viability as a food crop.

As with other species in the genus Elaeagnus, E. multiflora plants are actinorhizal, growing in symbiosis with the bacterium Frankia in the soil. These bacteria fix atmospheric nitrogen, making it available in usable form for the host plant, and indirectly for other nearby plants. This feature allows the plant to grow in poorer soils than it could otherwise.

There are several cultivars, such as Gigantea or Daiougoumi, Tillamook or Carmine, Red Gem, Sweet Scarlet, Hortensis, ranked here for fruit size which tends to be opposite for taste. Also there have been some hybridization efforts, leading to the JR1 hybrid, with merits on size and taste.

== Uses ==
This species is occasionally grown in Europe (France,Loraine)and North America as an ornamental plant and for its fruit. It is an established exotic species in parts of the eastern United States. In China, the leaves of the tree are used as a medicinal plant and a natural remedy for cough, diarrhea, itch, foul sores, and even cancer.

USDA classifies the shrub as a medium nitrogen fixer - it improves the soil.

== Fruit composition ==
The fruits contain:

11 – 18 % sugar,

1.5 – 2.3 % organic acids,

0.18 – 0.46 % pectin,

13.2 – 19 mg / 100 g of vitamin A,

16 – 33 mg / 100 g vitamin C (according to other sources up to 110.6 mg%, data for the Russian variety Krylyon).

It also contains about 0.3–0.5% tannins, about 68 mg/kg of iron, a lot of polyphenolic compounds (about 285–765 mg %), and amino acids. They contain 17 times more lycopene than tomatoes.

== History ==
It was introduced to Europe around 1850 (Netherlands). The French were the first to cultivate this fruit species in Europe around 1877, but cultivation never spread beyond a small part of the French province of Lorraine. The possibility of cultivation in Russia began to be investigated sometime after 1945, but more intensively only around 2000 (although the first seedlings were introduced to Russia as early as 1926). It has only been cultivated in America for the last 15-20 years (the first seedlings were imported to the USA about 100 years ago). In Poland, cultivation research began around 1995, in Ukraine around 1980. In China, Korea and especially Japan, goumi has been a common and highly valued fruit species for centuries.

== Cultivated varieties ==
- Sweet Scarlet: A red-berry Ukrainian variety popular in the United States. It is partially self-fertile, requiring another variety for pollination.
- Goumi SPP: Austrian variety, self-fertile and therefore capable of producing fruit without any other pollinator.
- Carmine: An American red-fruited variety, available in the United States. It is prized for its productivity and fruit quality.
- Yahidka: A small variety from Ukraine, ideal for small gardens or potted crops.
- Red Gem: A popular Russian variety in the United States, known for its fruit and disease resistance.
- Sakhalinskiy pervi - Russian variety
- Krilyon - Russian variety
- Moneron - Russian variety
- Taisa - Russian variety
- Sunrise Ruby - Korean variety
- Pippi - new uSA variety
- Gigantea (Daiougoumi): Japanese variety.Recognizable by its larger fruits (6 to 10 grams), this variety has excellent potential for hybridization and crop improvement.
- Macrocarpa: Another large-fruited variety, each fruit weighing about 3.5 grams, compared to other varieties whose fruits weigh about 1 gram.
- Bikkuri Gumi: A Japanese variety (translation "Surprise"). Possibly the same variety as Daiougoumi. The fruits appear to be even larger (10 grams)
