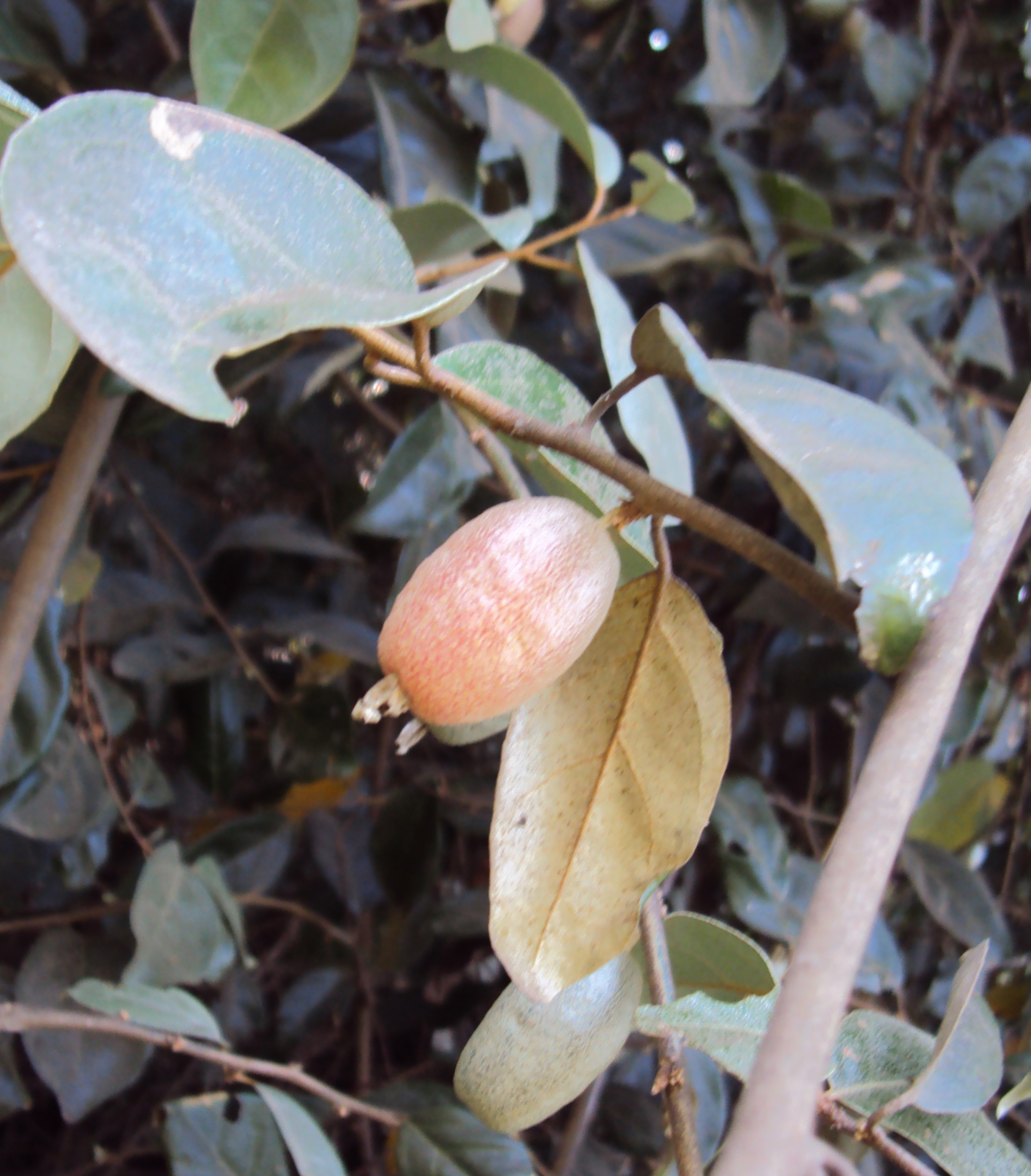

Scientific classification
- Kingdom: Plantae
- Clade: Tracheophytes
- Clade: Angiosperms
- Clade: Eudicots
- Clade: Rosids
- Order: Rosales
- Family: Elaeagnaceae
- Genus: Elaeagnus
- Species: E. conferta

Binomial name
- Elaeagnus conferta Roxb. 1820

Synonyms
- Elaeagnus conferta subsp. euconferta Servett.

= Elaeagnus conferta =

Species of flowering plant

Elaeagnus conferta is a Southeast Asian plant species in the fruiting oleaster genus Eleagnus. This species has been recorded from the Himalayas, China (Yunnan, Guangxi), Indochina and western Malesia: tropical and subtropical wet biomes.

== Description and varieties ==
Elaeagnus conferta is a climber and includes the following varieties:

- Elaeagnus conferta var. conferta
- Elaeagnus conferta var. menghaiensis W.K.Hu & H.F.Chow
- Elaeagnus conferta var. pallescens Servett.

== Gallery ==
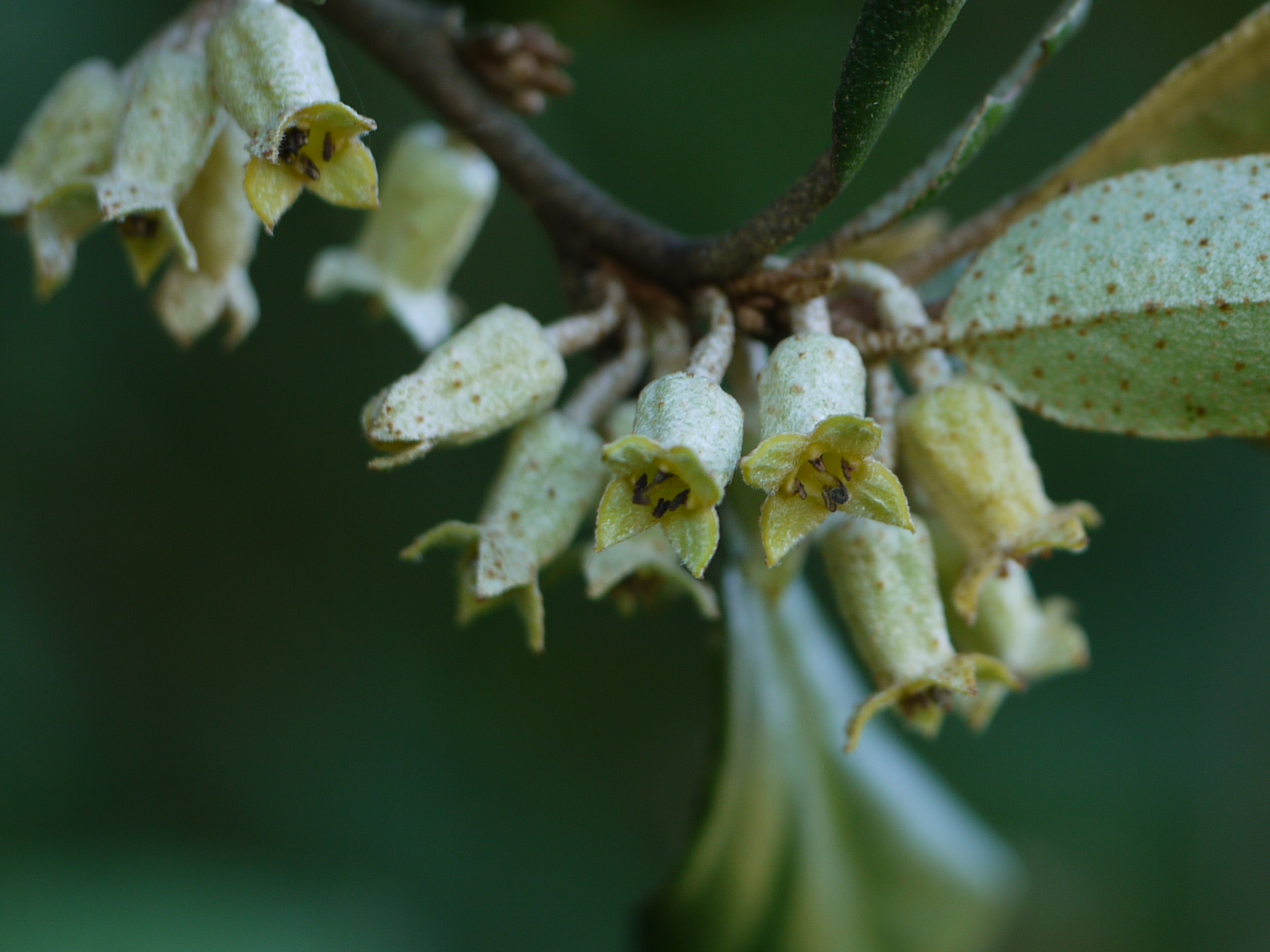

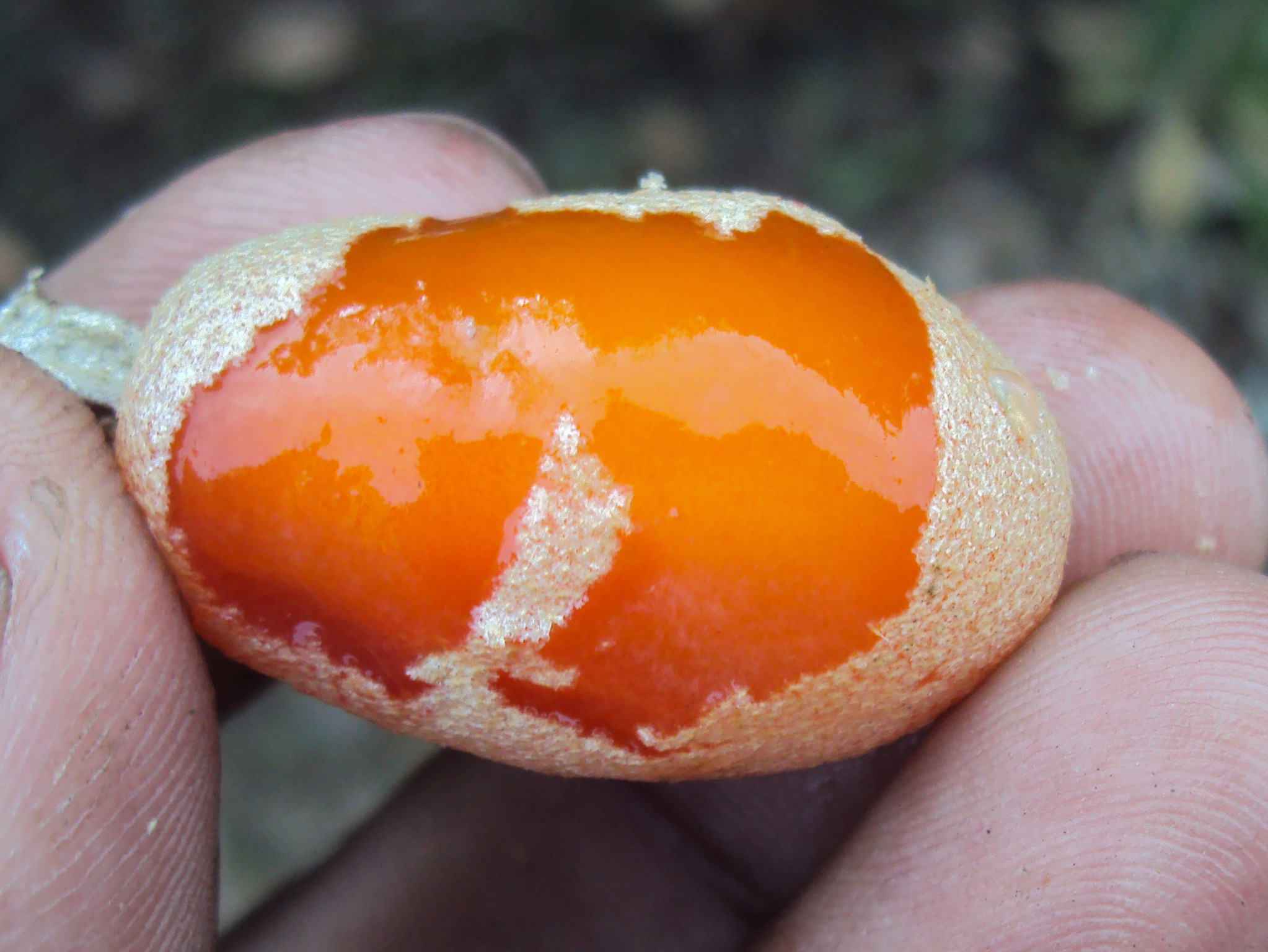

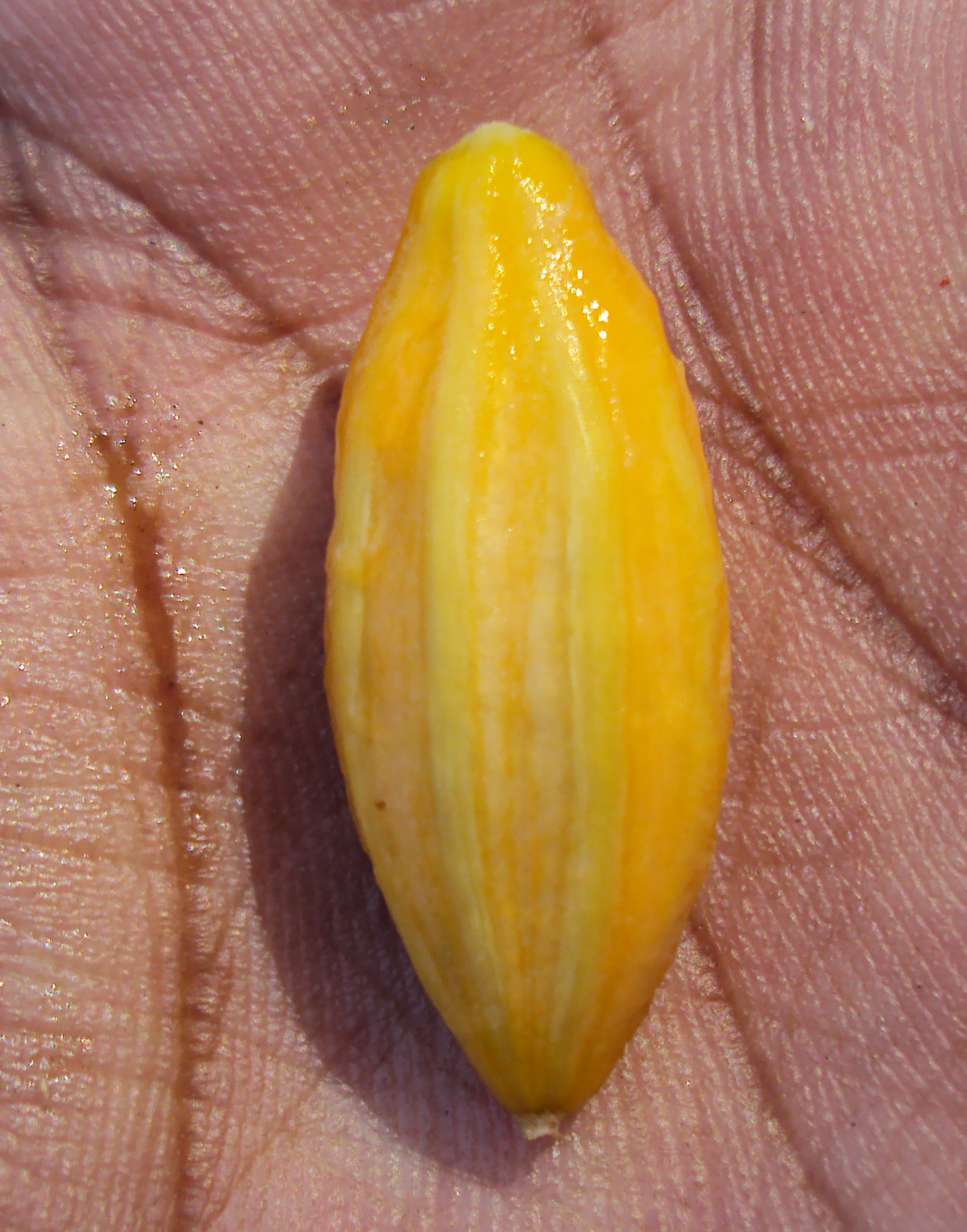

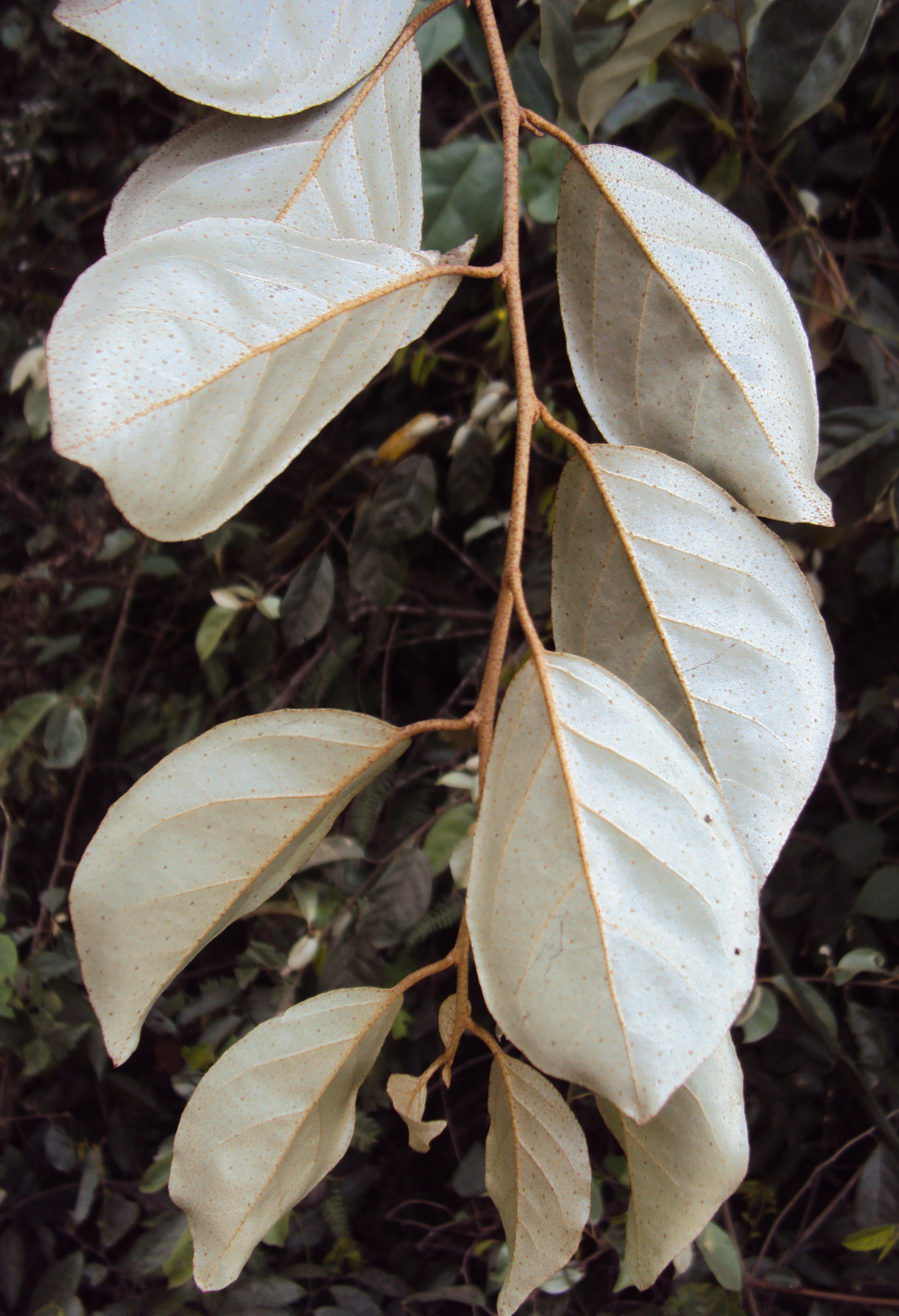
