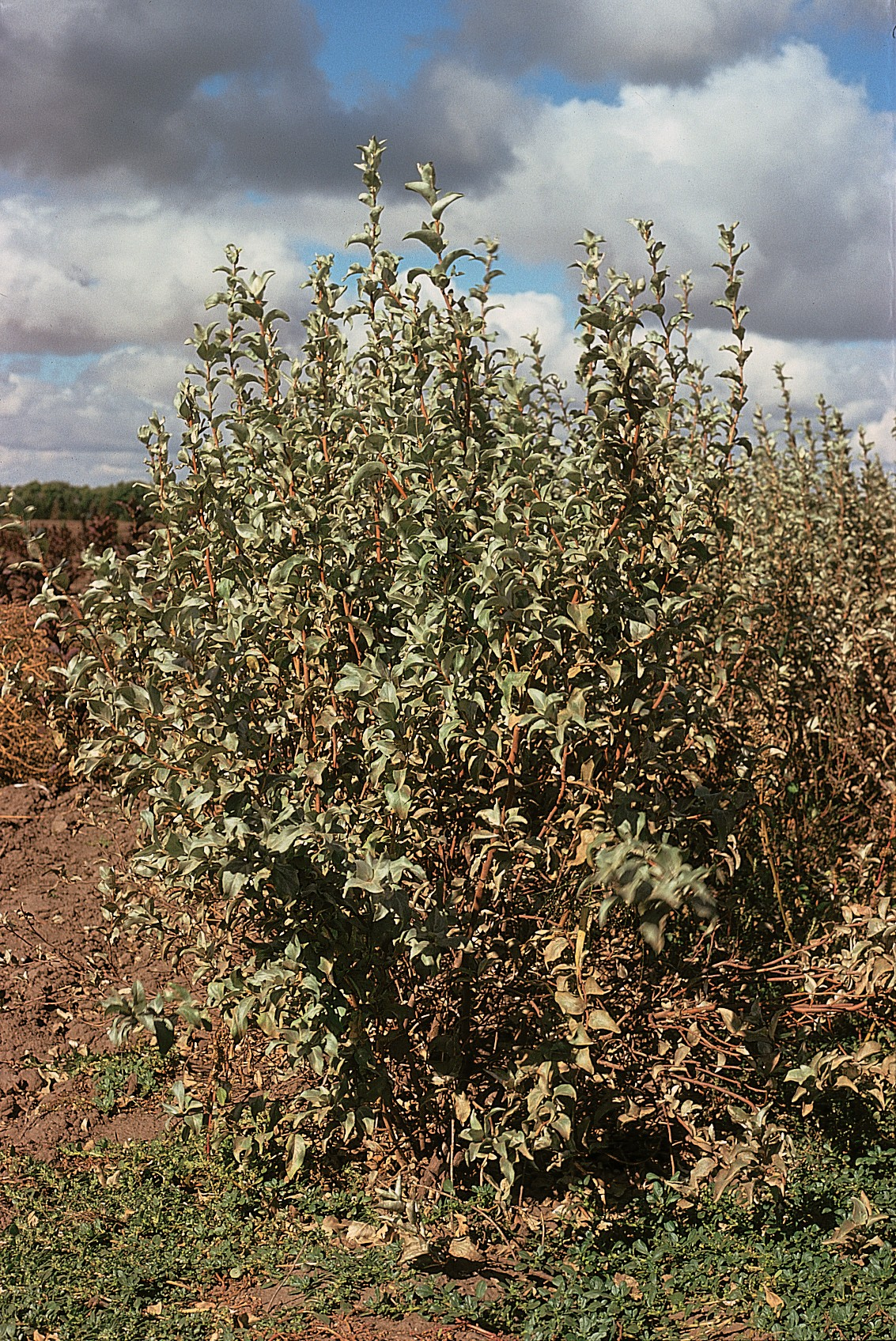

Conservation status
- Least Concern (IUCN 3.1)

- Secure (NatureServe)

Scientific classification
- Kingdom: Plantae
- Clade: Tracheophytes
- Clade: Angiosperms
- Clade: Eudicots
- Clade: Rosids
- Order: Rosales
- Family: Elaeagnaceae
- Genus: Elaeagnus
- Species: E. commutata

Binomial name
- Elaeagnus commutata Bernh. ex Rydb.

Synonyms
- Elaeagnus argentea Nutt. (1818); Elaeagnus argentea Pursh (1813); Elaeagnus glabra K.Koch (1872); Elaeagnus veteris-castelli Lepage (1955); Shepherdia argentea Schltdl. (1857)

= Elaeagnus commutata =

North American species of oleaster

Elaeagnus commutata, the silverberry or wolf-willow, is a species of Elaeagnus native to western and boreal North America, from southern Alaska through British Columbia east to Quebec, south to Utah, and across the upper Midwestern United States to South Dakota and western Minnesota. It typically grows on dry to moist sandy and gravel soils in steppes, meadows or woodland edges.

== Description ==
These plants are fast-growing shrubs or small trees growing to 1–4 meters (3 1/2–13 ft) tall and 2–5 m width. The leaves are broad lanceolate, 2–7 centimeters (3/4–2 3/4 in) long, silvery on both sides with dense small white scales. The fragrant flowers are yellow, with a four-lobed corolla 6–14 mm long. The fruits are ovoid drupes 9–12 mm long, also covered in silvery scales. The fruit pulp is floury in texture, and surrounds the single seed.

== Ecology ==
Sharp tailed grouse and songbirds eat the fruits. This plant is a food source for sharp tailed grouse in the winter. Silverberry is an important food for wildlife and it provides over one quarter of the diet for moose during winter in Montana. It also provides food for deer and elk. It provides cover and nesting sites for mallards and many passerine birds in North Dakota.

== Uses ==
The species is cultivated as an ornamental plant for its silvery foliage.

Both the fruit and seeds of this plant are edible either cooked or raw. The fruit is very astringent unless it is fully ripe. The fruit is a very rich source of vitamins and minerals especially A, C, and E. It is also a fairly good source of essential fatty acids, which are rarely found in fruits. This plant, like legumes, is able to fix nitrogen. When grown in orchards as a companion plant, it has been documented to increase fruit production by ten percent. Traditionally the fibrous bark of this tree has been twisted to make strong ropes, and woven into clothing and blankets

According to Arthur W. Bailey, "In rough fescue grasslands, silverberry at 1,000 stems per acre increases forage production."
