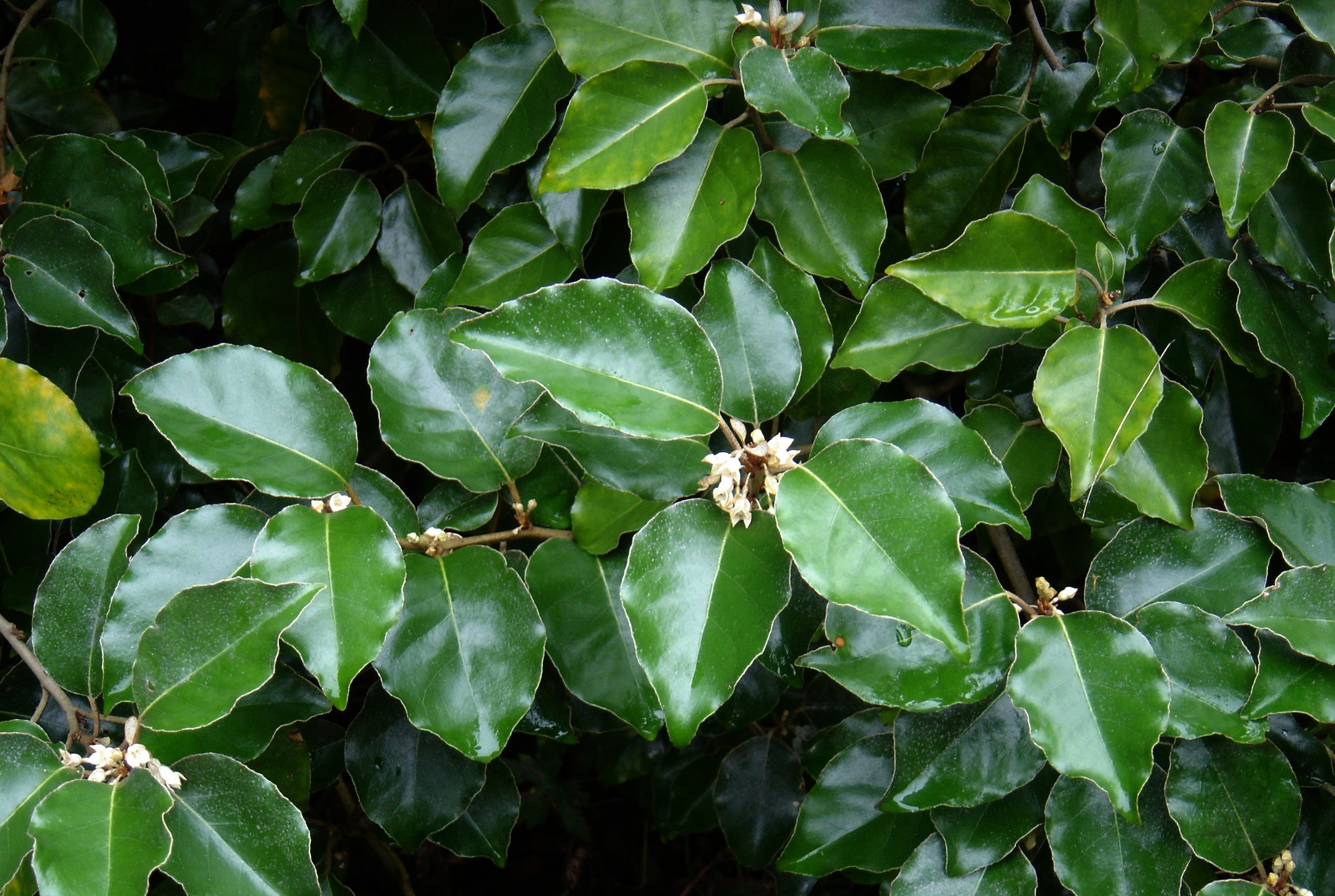

Scientific classification
- Kingdom: Plantae
- Clade: Tracheophytes
- Clade: Angiosperms
- Clade: Eudicots
- Clade: Rosids
- Order: Rosales
- Family: Elaeagnaceae
- Genus: Elaeagnus
- Species: E. macrophylla

Binomial name
- Elaeagnus macrophylla Thunb.

= Elaeagnus macrophylla =

Species of flowering plant

Elaeagnus macrophylla, the broad-leaved oleaster, is a species of flowering plant native to eastern Asia.

Growing to 4 m (13 ft) tall by 8 m (26 ft) broad, it is a substantial spreading evergreen shrub, with round glossy leaves which are silvery when young. Heavily fragrant cream flowers in autumn are followed by red fruit in spring.

Elaeagnus × submacrophylla, formerly known as Elaeagnus × ebbingei, is a hybrid between E. macrophylla and E. pungens. The hybrid and its cultivars are grown in gardens as ornamental plants.
