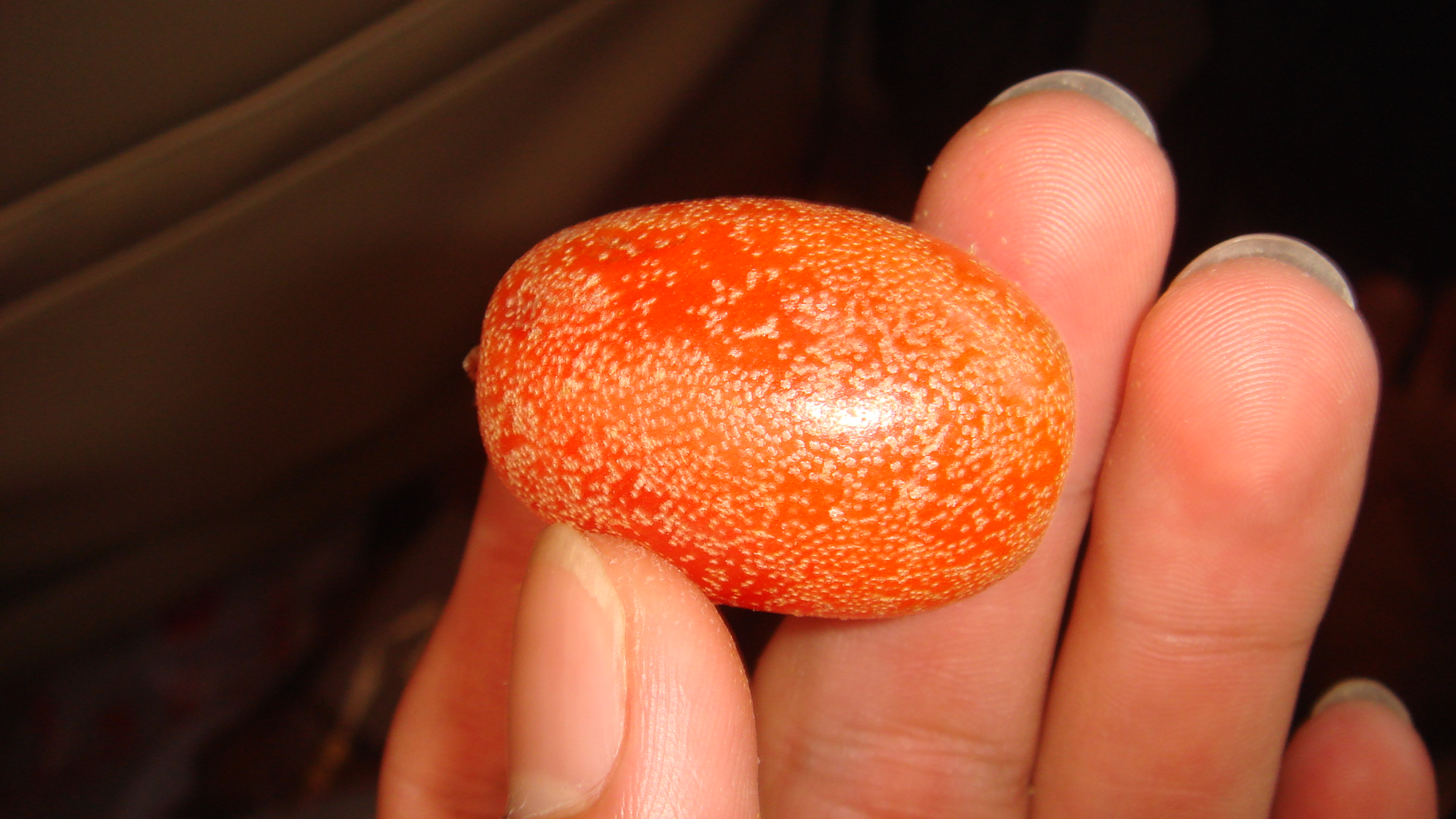

Scientific classification
- Kingdom: Plantae
- Clade: Tracheophytes
- Clade: Angiosperms
- Clade: Eudicots
- Clade: Rosids
- Order: Rosales
- Family: Elaeagnaceae
- Genus: Elaeagnus
- Species: E. tonkinensis

Binomial name
- Elaeagnus tonkinensis Servett. 1908

= Elaeagnus tonkinensis =

Species of flowering plant

Elaeagnus tonkinensis is a species of plant in the oleaster family found around Southern China and Vietnam (where it is called nhót).
