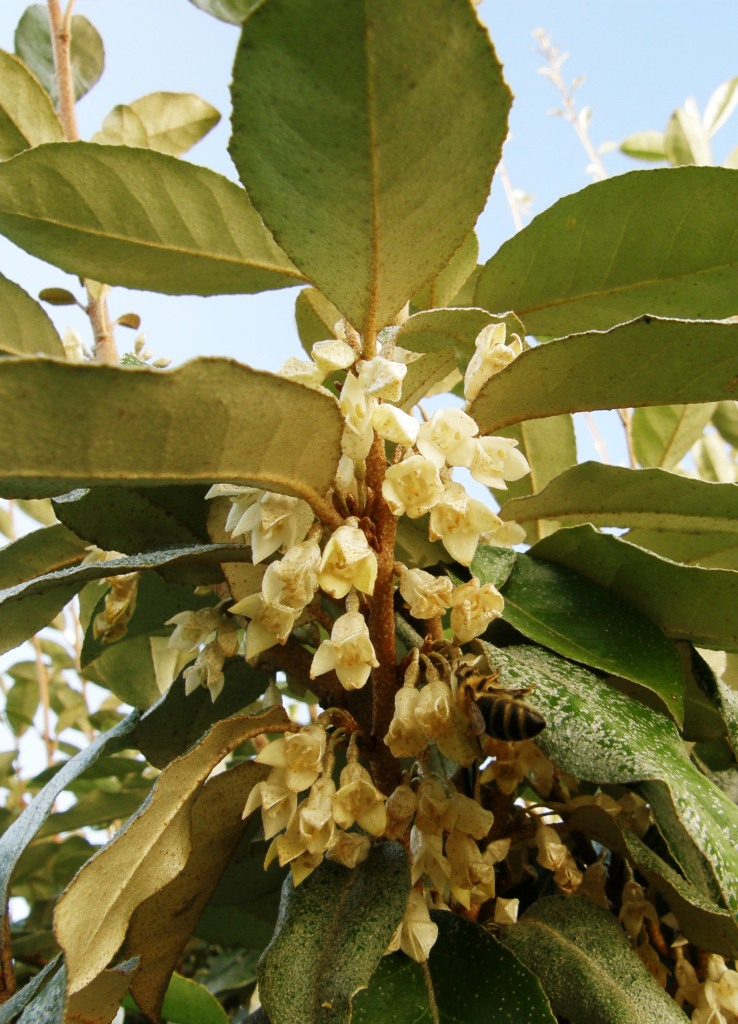
- Flowers

Scientific classification
- Kingdom: Plantae
- Clade: Tracheophytes
- Clade: Angiosperms
- Clade: Eudicots
- Clade: Rosids
- Order: Rosales
- Family: Elaeagnaceae
- Genus: Elaeagnus
- Species: E. × submacrophylla

Binomial name
- Elaeagnus × submacrophylla Servett.

Synonyms
- Elaeagnus × ebbingei J.Door., nom. illeg.; Elaeagnus × hisauchii Makino ex Nakai; Elaeagnus × nikaii Nakai

= Elaeagnus × submacrophylla =

Species of flowering plant

Elaeagnus × submacrophylla, formerly known as Elaeagnus × ebbingei, is a hybrid between Elaeagnus macrophylla and Elaeagnus pungens. Several cultivars, including 'Gilt Edge', are grown in gardens as ornamental plants. Both the hybrid and 'Gilt Edge' have gained the Royal Horticultural Society's Award of Garden Merit.

== Description ==
Elaeagnus × submacrophylla is an evergreen shrub, ultimately growing to about 4 m (13 ft). The upper surfaces of the leaves are dark green, sometimes appearing metallic; the lower surfaces are silvery and scaly. Small fragrant tubular white flowers appear in autumn.

== Taxonomy ==
The hybrid was discovered in 1929 by Simon Doorenbos, a Dutch horticulturalist, while he was director of the Parks Department in The Hague. He sowed seed from several Elaeagnus species growing next to one another. These included E. macrophylla and E. pungens. Doorenbos gave the hybrid the epithet ebbingei, honouring J.W.E. Ebbinge. The name E. × ebbingei was widely used until it was realized that the plant had already been described by Camille Servettaz in 1909 as E. submacrophylla – Servettaz did not realize it was a hybrid. Hence the name with priority is E. × submacrophylla and E. × ebbingei is now regarded as an illegitimate name.

== Cultivars ==
Cultivars include:

- 'Albert Doorenbos' – large green leaves
- 'Compacta' – dwarf plant
- 'Costal Gold' – broad leaves, pale yellow in the centre when mature
- 'Gilt Edge' AGM – leaves with dark green centres, golden yellow margins
- 'Limelight' – leaves with yellow and pale green central areas when mature
- 'The Hague' – small green leaves
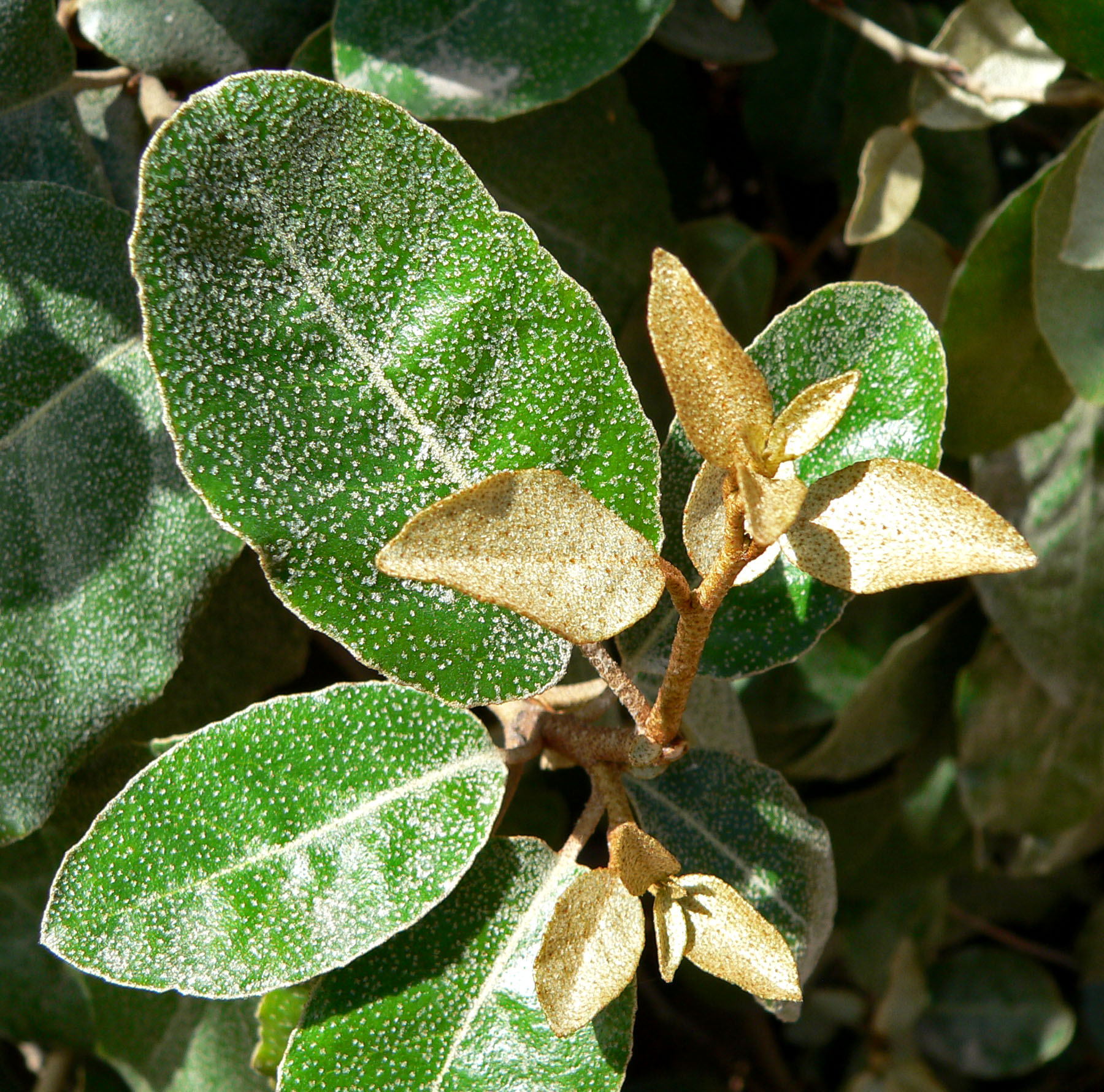
Young leaves

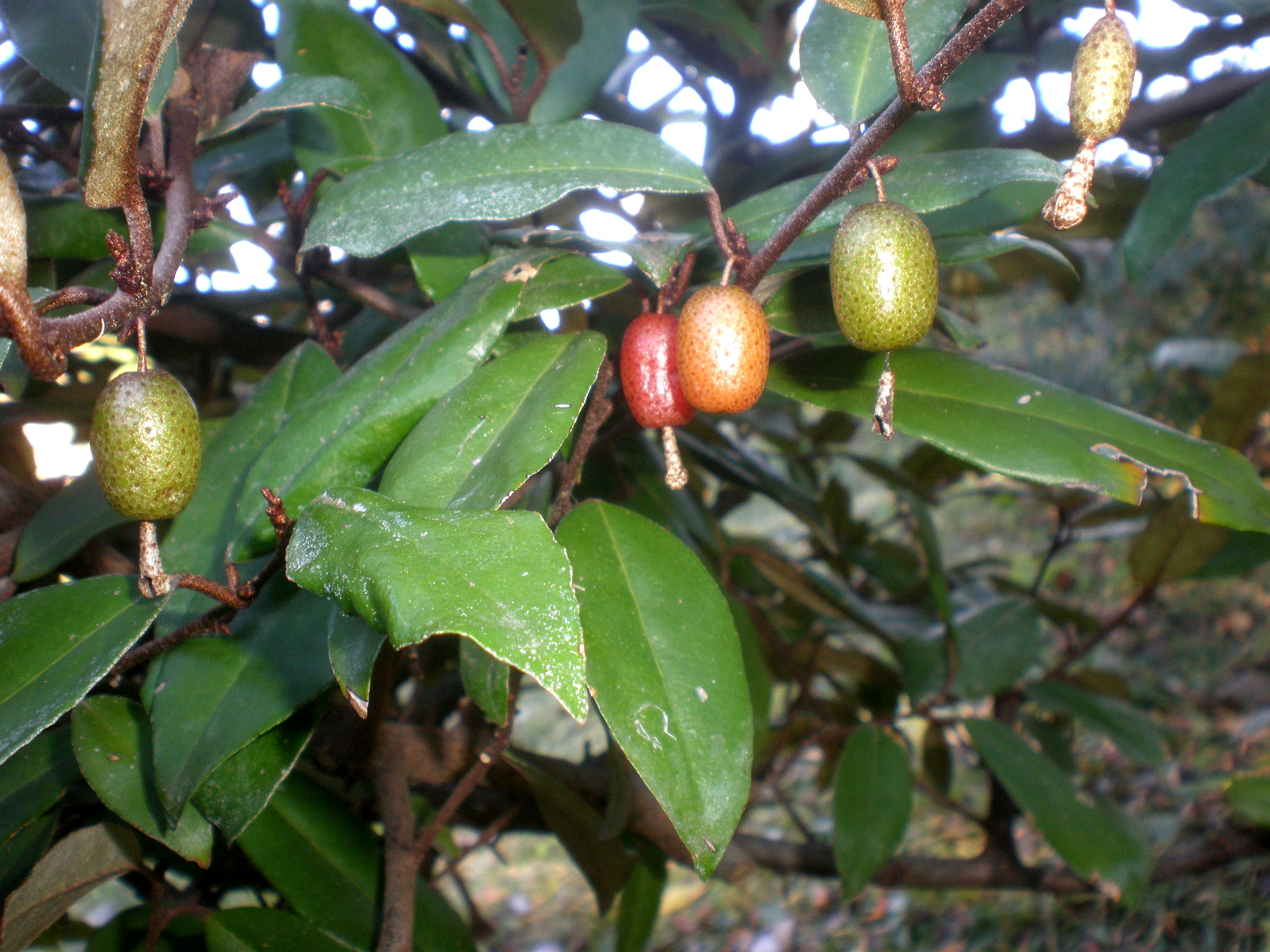
Fruit

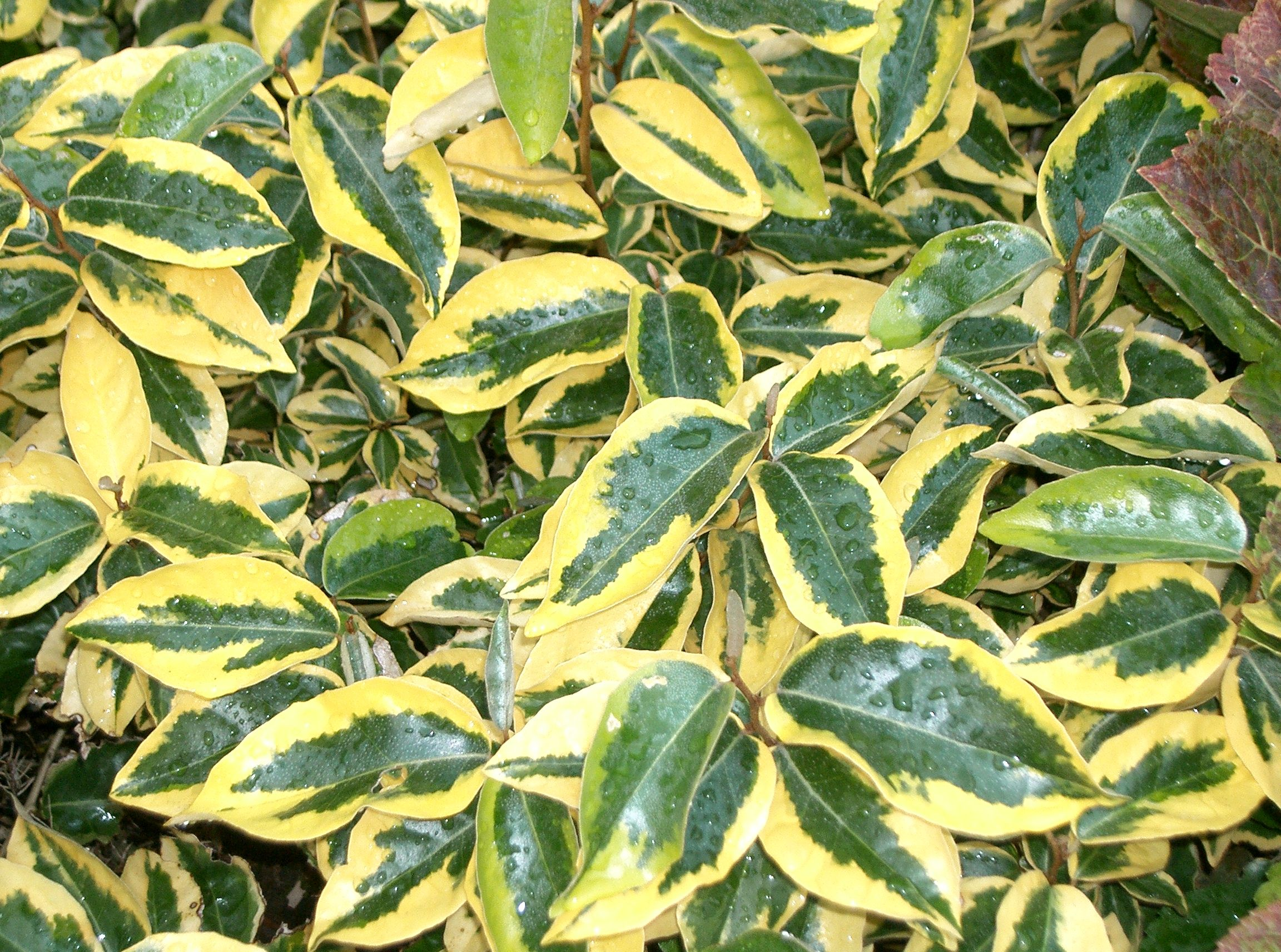
'Gilt Edge'

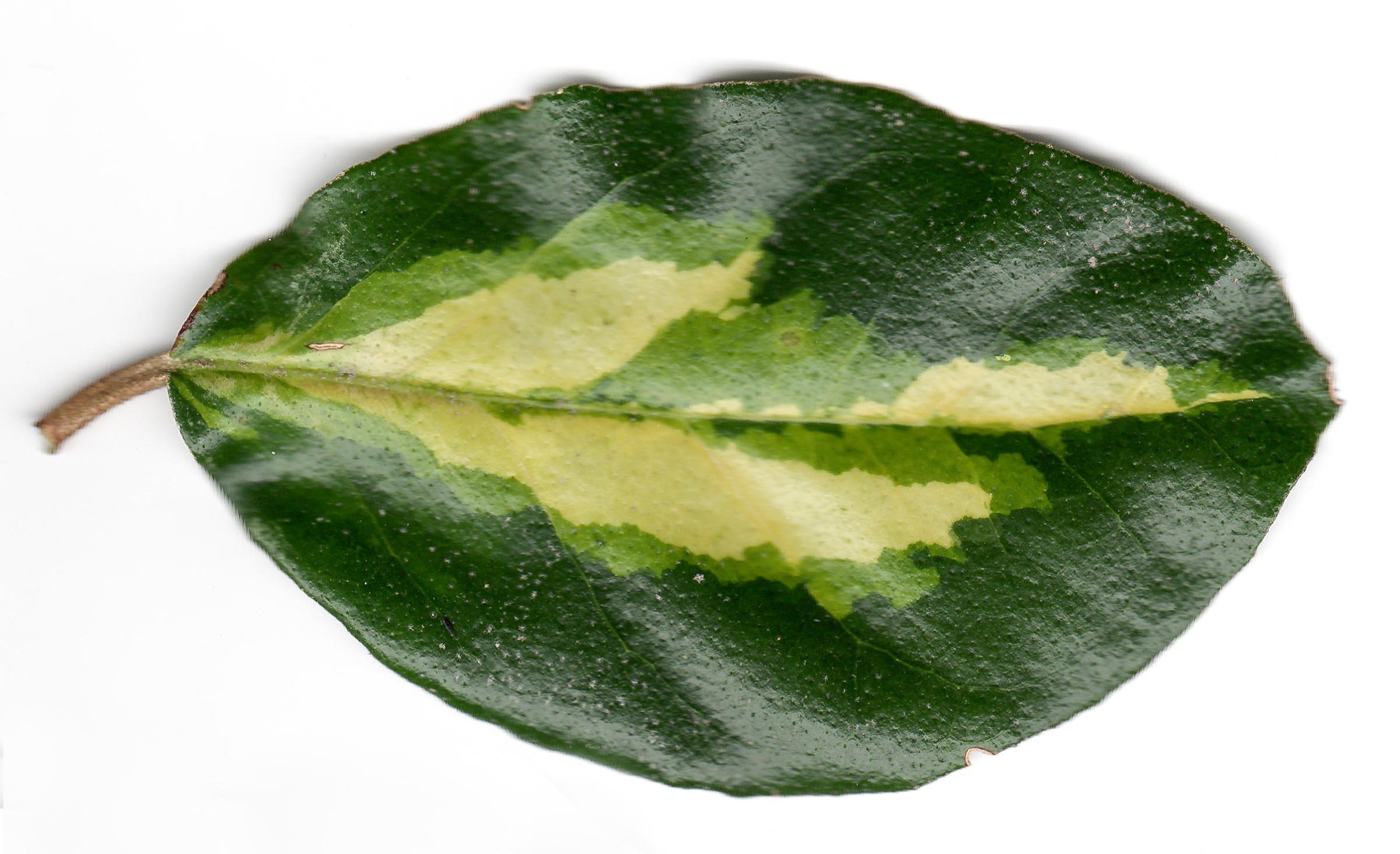
'Limelight'
