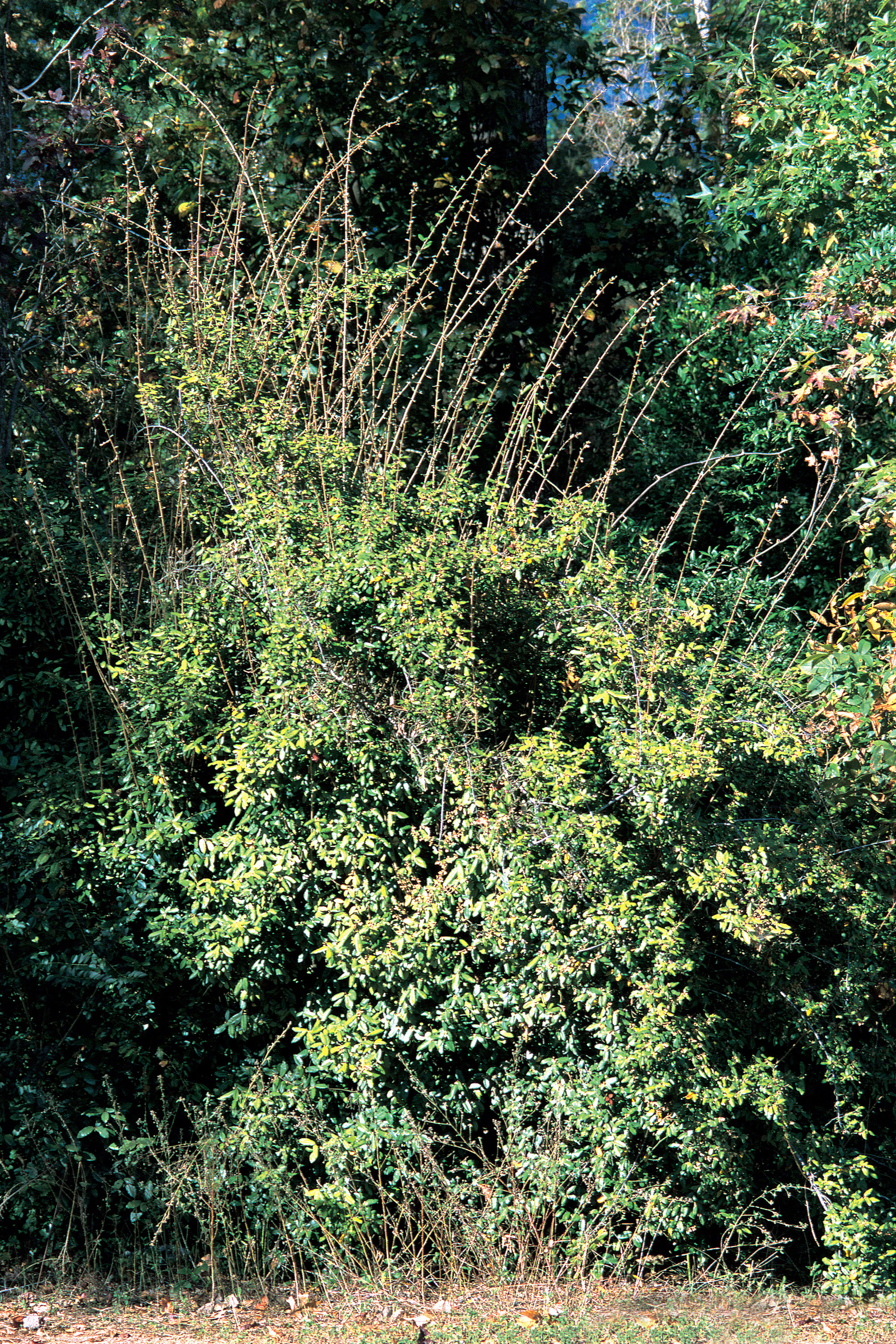

Scientific classification
- Kingdom: Plantae
- Clade: Tracheophytes
- Clade: Angiosperms
- Clade: Eudicots
- Clade: Rosids
- Order: Rosales
- Family: Elaeagnaceae
- Genus: Elaeagnus
- Species: E. pungens

Binomial name
- Elaeagnus pungens Thunb.

= Elaeagnus pungens =

Species of flowering plant

Elaeagnus pungens is a species of flowering plant in the family Elaeagnaceae, known by the common names thorny olive, spiny oleaster and silverthorn; also by the family name "oleaster". It is native to Asia, including China and Japan. It is present in the southeastern United States as an introduced species, a common landscaping and ornamental plant, and sometimes an invasive species.

== Description ==
Elaeagnus pungens is a dense, branching shrub which can reach over 7 metres (23 ft) tall by 4 metres (13 ft) wide. It sprouts prolifically from its stem, spreading out and twining into adjacent vegetation. Parts of the stem are covered in thorns which can be up to 8 centimetres (3.1 in) long. The evergreen, alternately-arranged leaves are up to 10 centimetres (3.9 in) long but under 5 centimetres (2.0 in) wide. The undersides are silvery white with brown flecks. Tubular flowers are borne in clusters of up to three. The flowers are yellowish or white and are sweet-scented. The fruit is a drupe up to 1.5 centimetres (0.59 in) long which contains one seed. It is reddish with silver scales. Blooming occurs in the autumn and fruit develops during the spring. The plant grows quickly, with shoots growing over one meter per season. The growth has been described as "aggressive", with shoots extending many meters into neighboring treetops. The seeds are dispersed by birds.

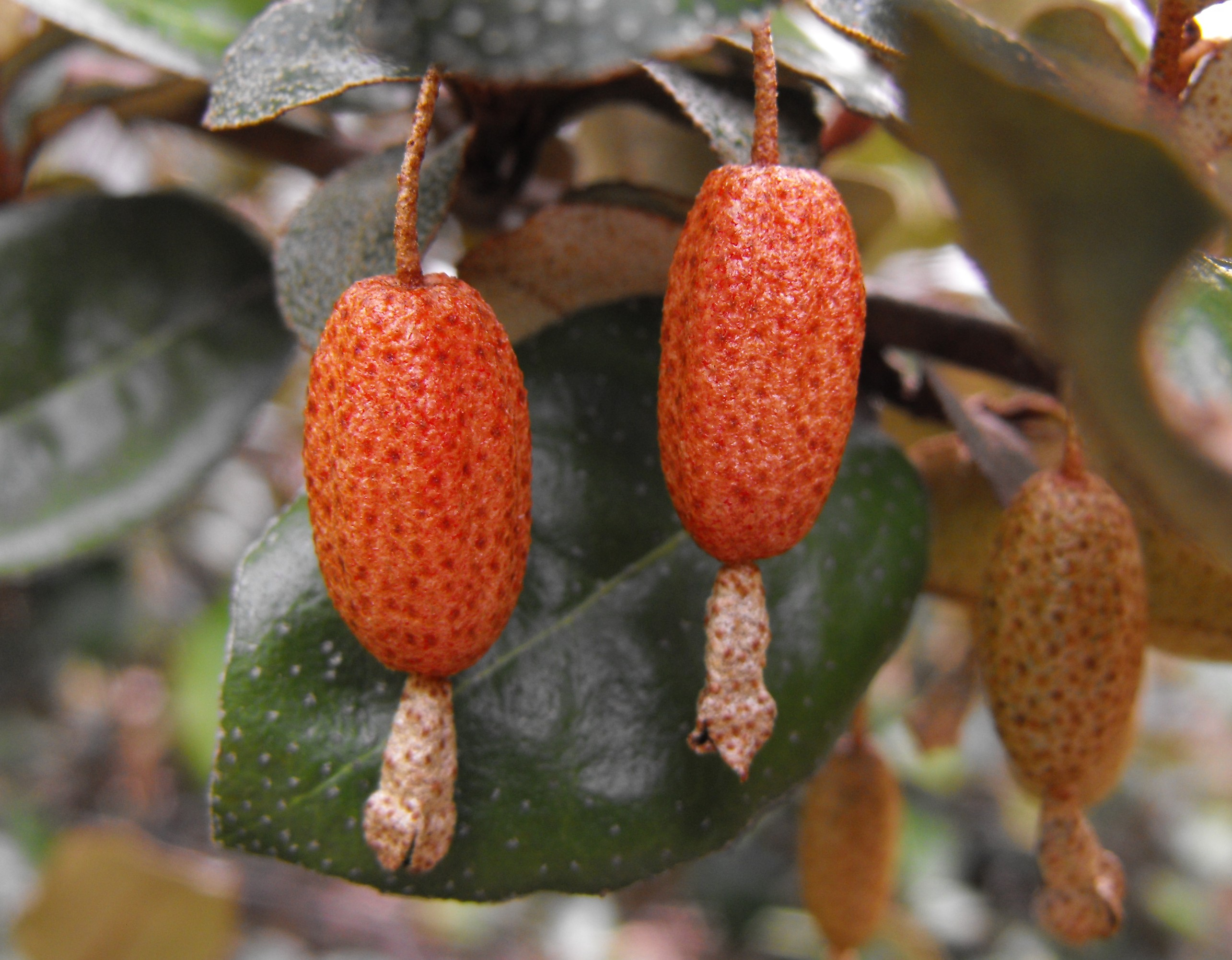
Fruits

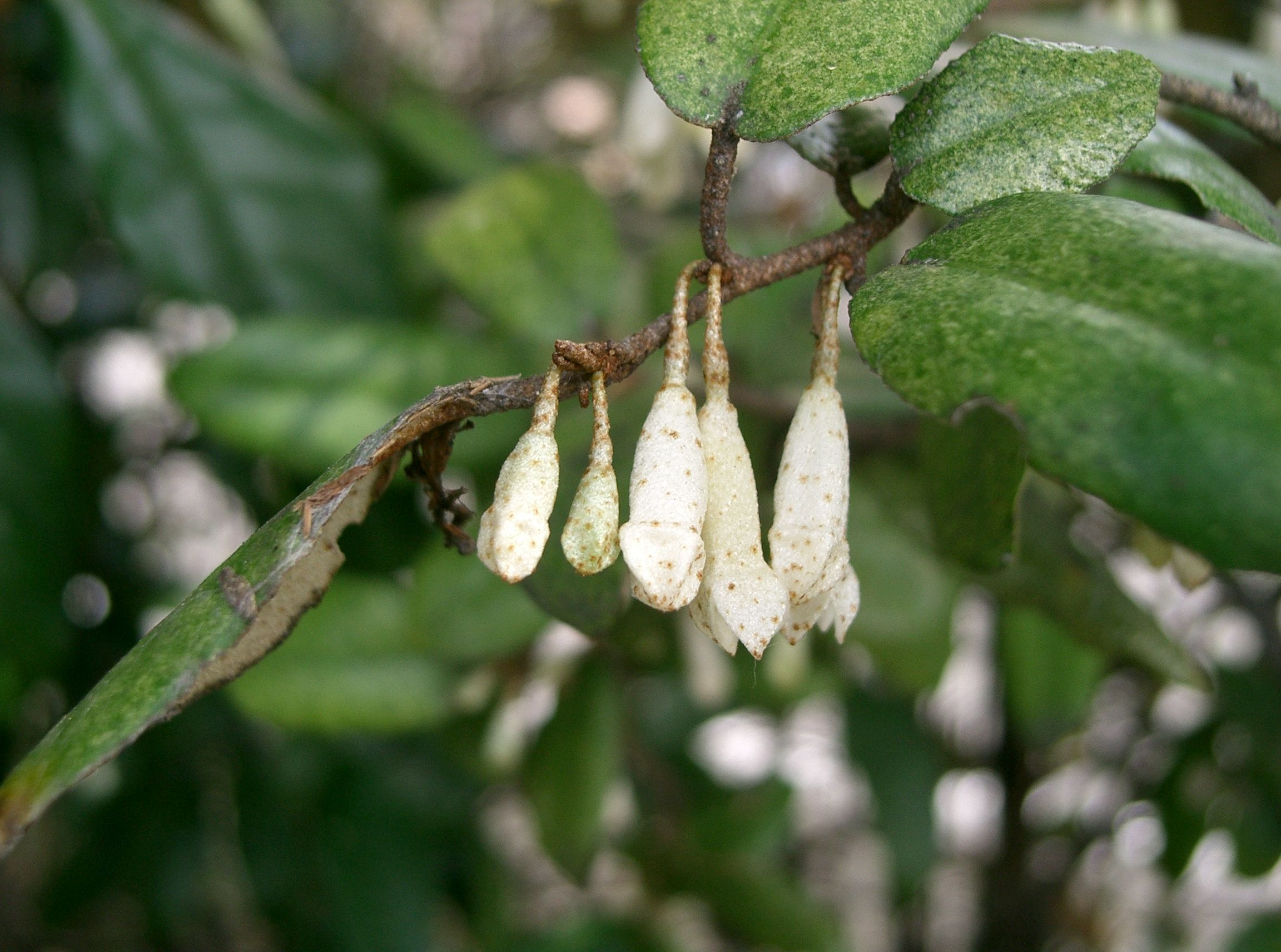
Flowers

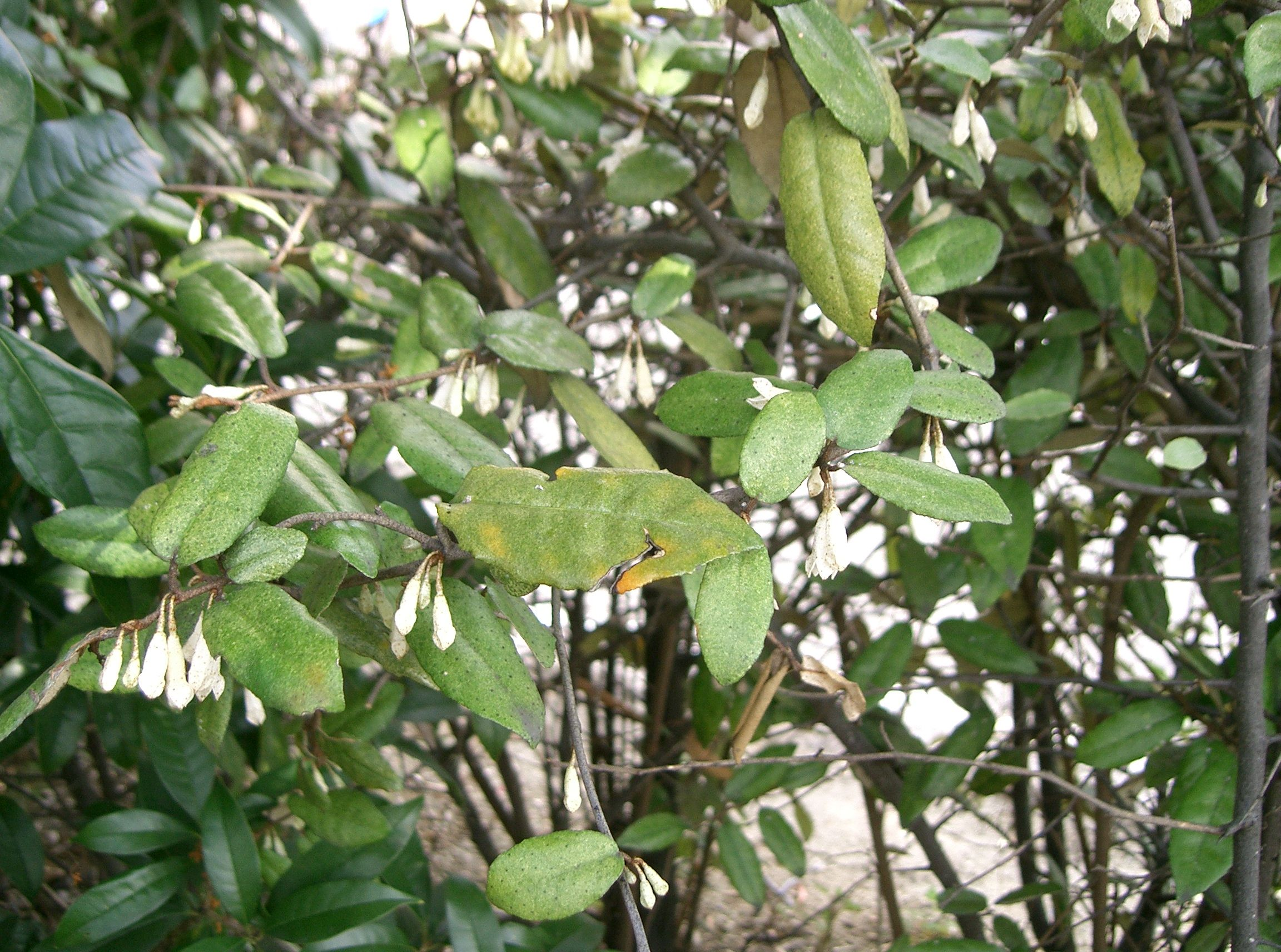
Leaves

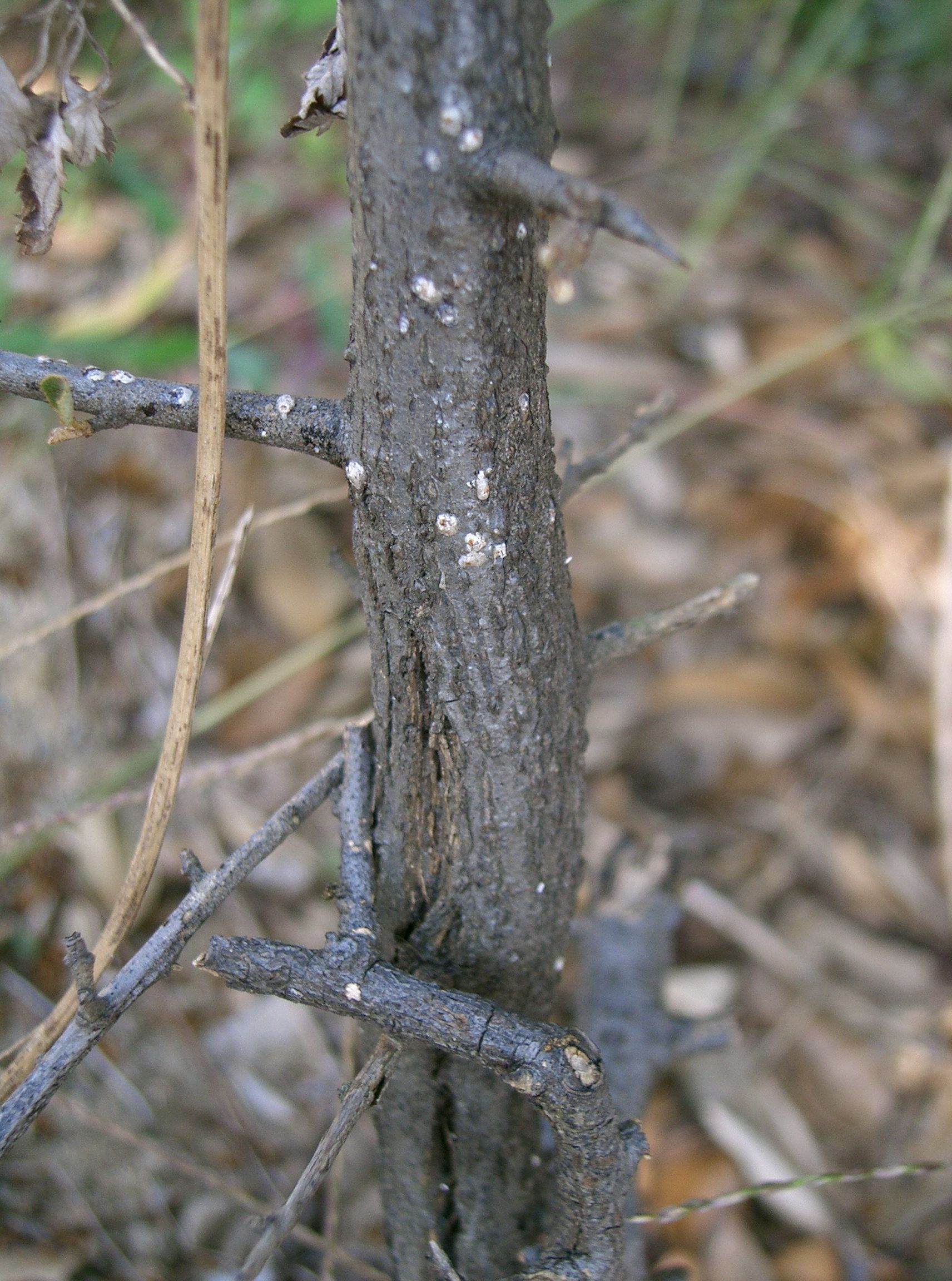
Stem

Peltate trichomes on leaf

== Habitat ==
In China this plant occurs on hillsides and in thickets. In Japan it grows in scrub dominated by Quercus phillyraeoides and Pittosporum tobira. This plant was introduced to the United States from Asia in 1830. It has been used extensively as a landscaping plant. Its densely packed, spreading form has proved useful along roadsides and highway medians. It was also used to revegetate abandoned mining sites in Kentucky and other areas. It took hold easily and still persists in these places. It also spread into the wild, having escaped cultivation. In North Carolina it has been reported from longleaf pine forests, urban and maritime forests, and oak-hickory woodlands. In Alabama it grows in urban areas and in protected, natural habitats as a weed. The South Carolina Southern Weed Science Society places it as an invasive species in their local area.

== Cultivation ==
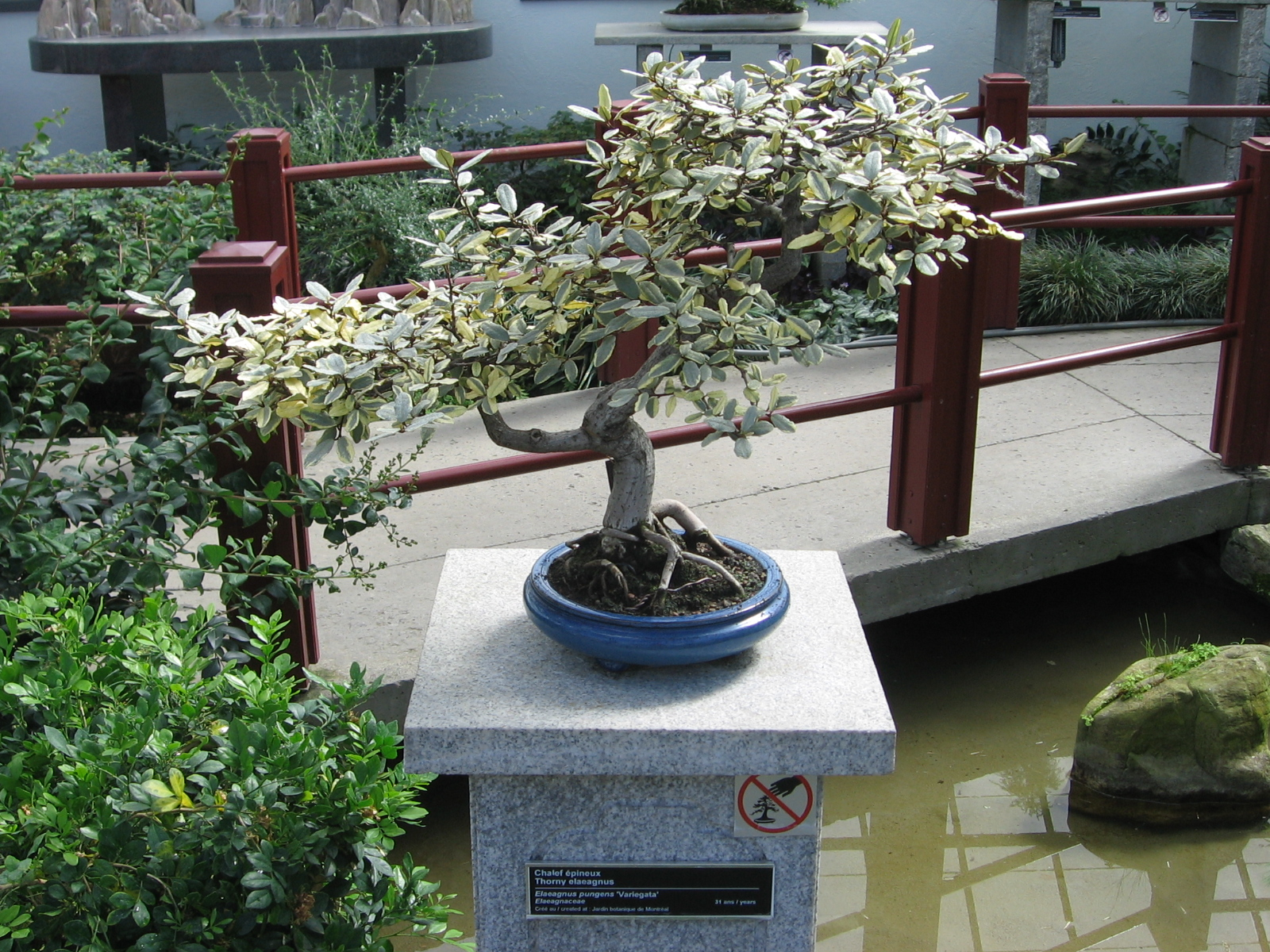
E. pungens as bonsai, Montreal Botanical Garden

Despite its invasive potential, E. pungens is widely cultivated as a garden plant in temperate regions. It tolerates varied environmental conditions, including heat, cold, wind, coastal conditions, shade, and full sun. It is very drought-tolerant. It can grow in varied soil types, including those found at mine spoils. Numerous cultivars have been developed, especially for variegated foliage effects. Commercially available cultivars include 'Maculata', which has gold coloration on the leaves, as well as 'Fruitlandii', 'Hosoba-Fukurin' and 'Goldrim'.

Elaeagnus × submacrophylla, formerly known as E. × ebbingei, is a hybrid between E. macrophylla and E. pungens. The hybrid and its cultivars are also grown in gardens as ornamental plants.

== Ecology ==
Many birds feed on the fruits of the shrub. Birds are most attracted to the plants that produce the most fruit. Studies have found that cedar waxwings attracted to roadside plantings of the shrub are susceptible to automobile-related mortality. In Brazos County, Texas between 8 March and 5 April 1981, researchers counted 298 cedar waxwings that had been killed while trying to get fruits from thorny-olive shrubs growing along one highway.
