= H. salicifolia =

H. salicifolia may refer to:

- Hakea salicifolia, the willow-leaved Hakea, a plant indigenous to New South Wales, Australia
- Hebe salicifolia, a synonym of Veronica salicifolia, the koromiko, a flowering plant found throughout the South Island of New Zealand and in Chile
- Heimia salicifolia, the sinicuichi, a shrub
- Heteromeles salicifolia, a synonym for H. artutifolia, the toyon, a common perennial shrub native to California, USA and the extreme northwest of Mexico
- Heteropsis salicifolia, Kunth, a plant in the genus Heteropsis
- Hippophae salicifolia, the willow-leaved sea-buckthorn, a plant species in the genus Hippophae
- Hygrophila salicifolia, a plant species in the genus Hygrophila
- Hypoestes salicifolia, a plant species in the genus Hypoestes

== See also ==
- Salicifolia (disambiguation)
