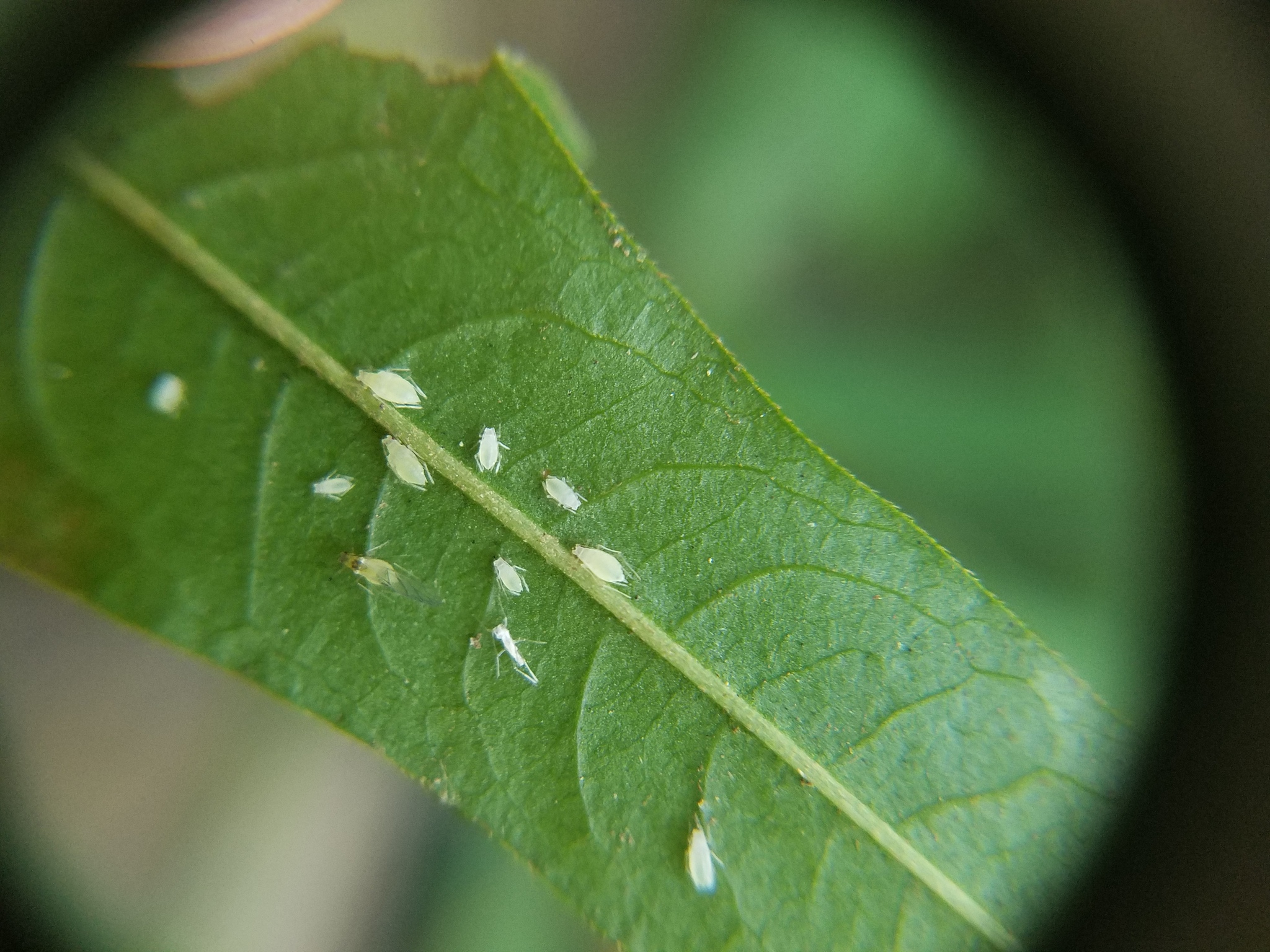
- Capitophorus hippophaes on a Persicaria sp.

Scientific classification
- Kingdom: Animalia
- Phylum: Arthropoda
- Class: Insecta
- Order: Hemiptera
- Suborder: Sternorrhyncha
- Family: Aphididae
- Subfamily: Aphidinae
- Tribe: Macrosiphini
- Genus: Capitophorus
- Species: C. hippophaes

Binomial name
- Capitophorus hippophaes (Walker, 1852)

Synonyms
- Aphis hippophaes Walker, 1852; Phorodon hippophaes (Walker, 1852)

= Capitophorus hippophaes =

Species of true bug

Capitophorus hippophaes (common name - polygonum aphid), is a species of aphid in the family Aphididae. It was first described in 1852 by Francis Walker as Aphis hippophaes.

Primary host plants are species in the Hippophae family, and in the genus Elaeagnus, and secondary hosts are species in the genera Persicaria, and Polygonum.

It is native to Europe. However, it is also found in the United States and Canada, New Zealand, the Korean Peninsula, Taiwan, Pakistan, South Africa, Georgia, Bangladesh, Ecuador, and Australia.
