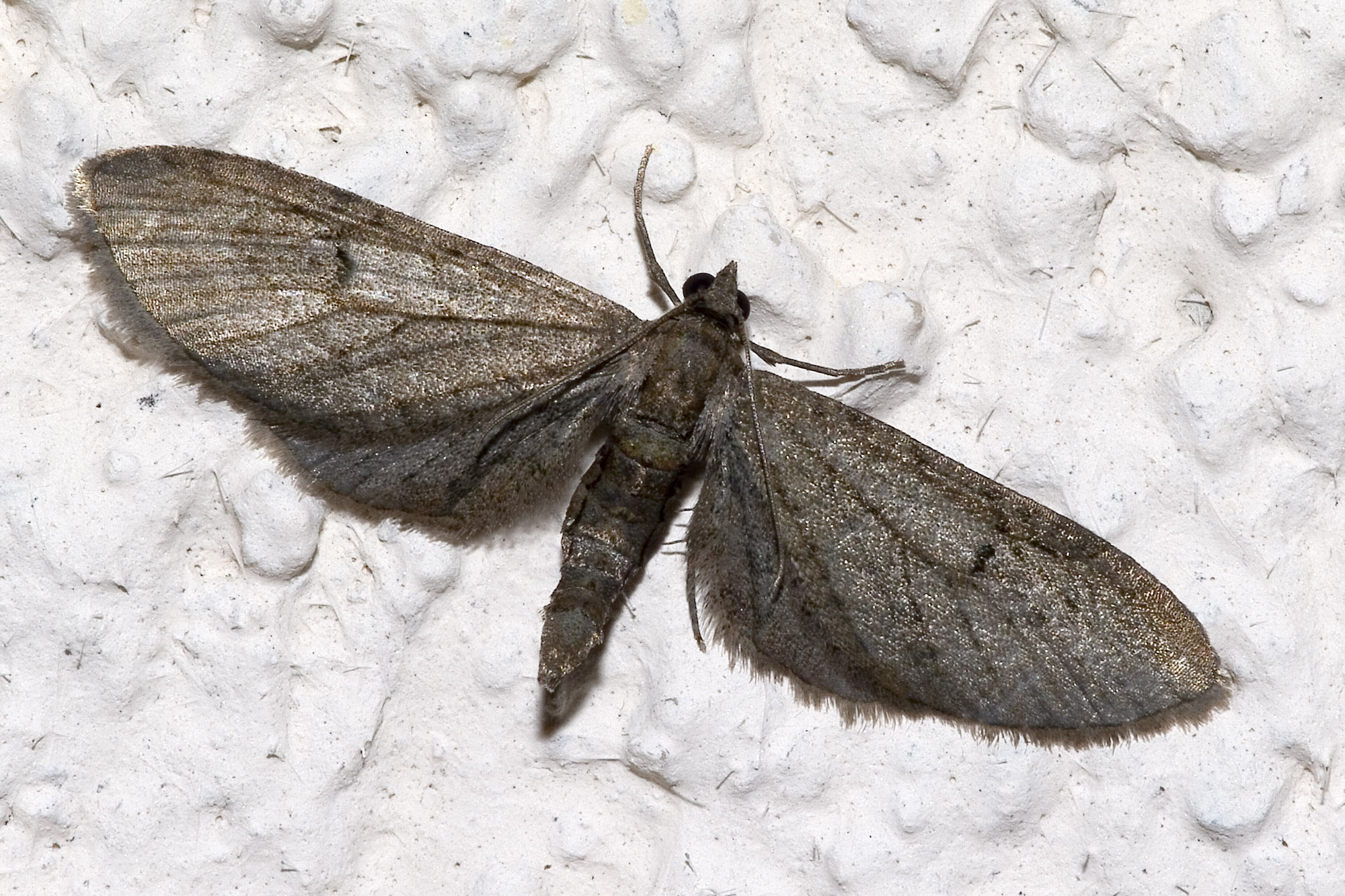

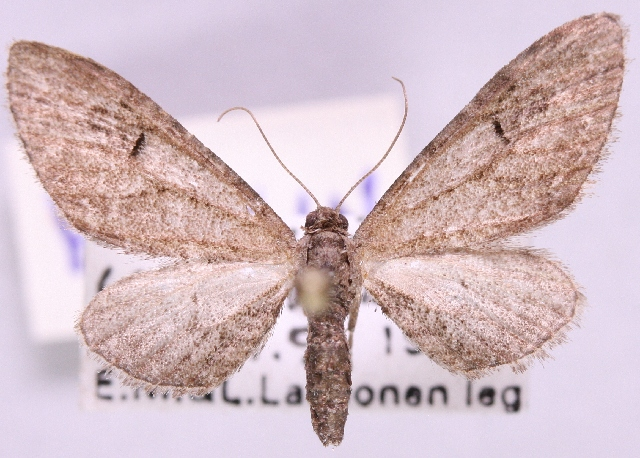

Scientific classification
- Kingdom: Animalia
- Phylum: Arthropoda
- Class: Insecta
- Order: Lepidoptera
- Family: Geometridae
- Genus: Eupithecia
- Species: E. innotata

Binomial name
- Eupithecia innotata (Hufnagel, 1767)

Synonyms
- Phalaena innotata Hufnagel, 1767; Eupithecia alexandriana Vardikjan, 1972; Phalaena innotata Thunberg, 1788; Eupithecia sergiana Vardikjan, 1972; Eupithecia suspectata Dietze, 1871; Larentia tamarisciata Freyer, 1836; Eupithecia uliata Staudinger, 1897; Eupithecia ulicada Dietze, 1910; Eupithecia innotata f. grisescens Petersen, 1909; Eupithecia petersenaria Wnukowsky, 1929

= Eupithecia innotata =

Species of moth

Eupithecia innotata, the angle-barred pug, is a moth of the family Geometridae. The species was first described by Johann Siegfried Hufnagel in 1767. It ranges from Spain in the west to western Siberia and Central Asia in the east.

There are three forms found in the British Isles:

- E. innotata sensu stricto (angle-barred pug) is found only on the east and south-east coasts
- f. fraxinata (ash pug) is widely distributed
- rare f. tamarisciata (tamarisk pug)

The forewings are generally dark brown or grey with few distinguishing marks apart from a small white tornal spot which may not be present on the frequent melanic forms. They are crossed by darker oblique lines, which are angled on the front margin; the submarginal line is white and irregular, especially at each end. The wingspan is 18–24 mm.

Two broods are produced each year with the adults flying in May and June and again in August. Moths of the spring brood are usually darker in colour than the later specimens.

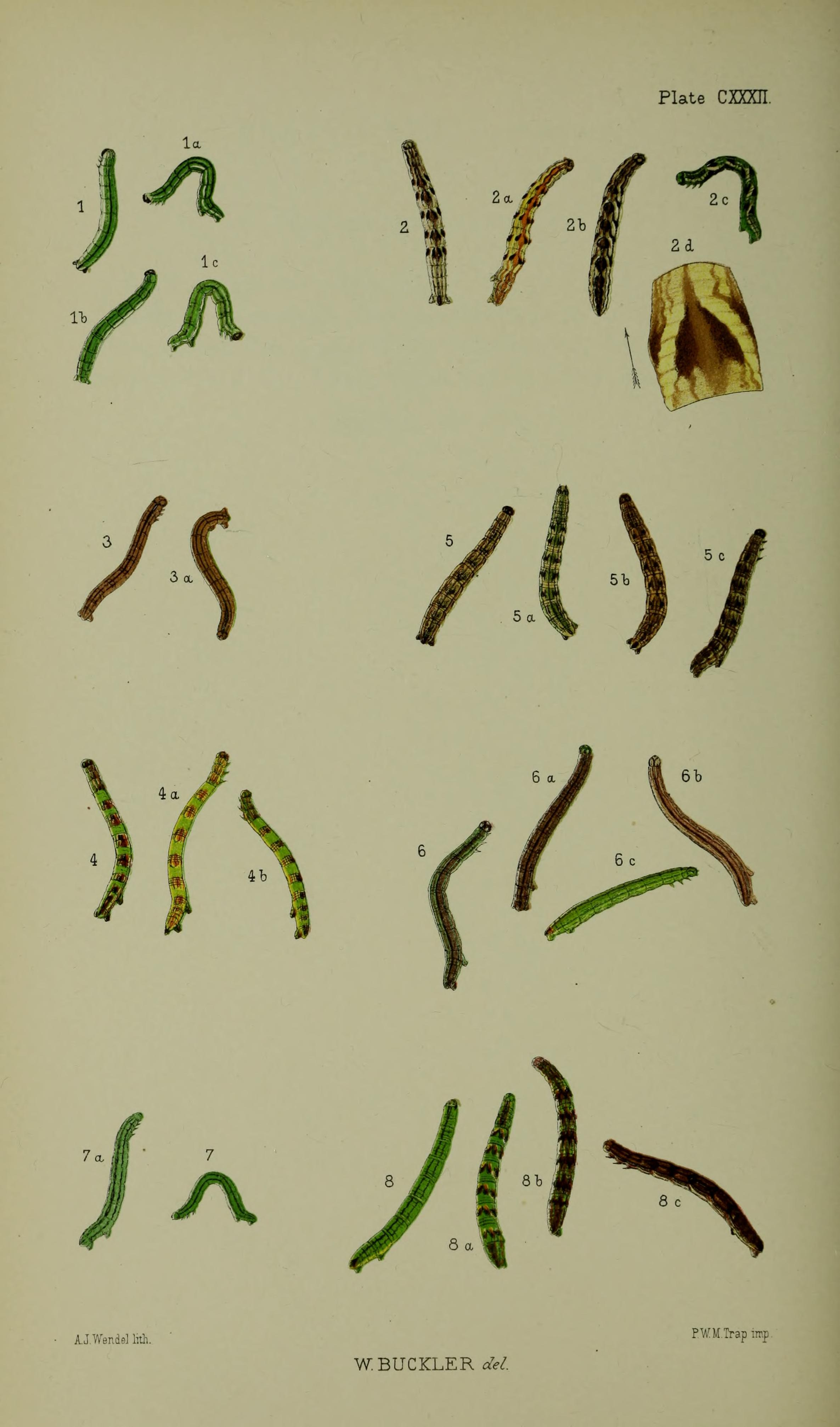
Figs 8,8a,8b,8c Eupithecia innotata f. fraxinata larvae after final moult

The larva is bright yellow-brown with brown and greenish markings, most strikingly a variety of large, brown-green spots along the back. It has numerous, small white warts all over the body.

The caterpillars of the three races have different food plants:

- f. fraxinata feeding on ash
- E. innotata sensu stricto feeding on sea-buckthorn
- f. tamarisciata is found on the alien food plant tamarisk

The species overwinters as a pupa.
