= Hippophae × goniocarpa =

Scientific classification
- Kingdom: Plantae
- Clade: Tracheophytes
- Clade: Angiosperms
- Clade: Eudicots
- Clade: Rosids
- Order: Rosales
- Family: Elaeagnaceae
- Genus: Hippophae
- Species: H. × goniocarpa

Binomial name
- Hippophae × goniocarpa Y.S.Lian & al. ex Swenson & Bartish

Synonyms
- Hippophae goniocarpa Lian, X.L Chen et K. Sun; Hippophae goniocarpa subsp. litangensis (Lian et X.L. Chen ex Swenson et Bartish)

Hippophae × goniocarpa is a natural hybrid of the plant species H. neurocarpa and H. sinensis, belonging to the family Elaeagnaceae, previously thought to be subspecies called H. goniocarpa subp. litangensis.

The Latin specific epithet goniocarpa refers to goniocarpus -a -um with angular fruits. Also used by Eucalyptus goniocarpa, Iris goniocarpa and Psychotria goniocarpa.

== Description ==
Hippophae × goniocarpa grows in mountainous regions in Nepal, Mongolia and China on mountain slopes, river banks, flood lands and valley terraces. The growth altitude is typically between 2,650 and 3,700 m (8,690 and 12,140 ft). It is distinguished by the young branchlets and the lower surface of leaves.
