= Irigenin =

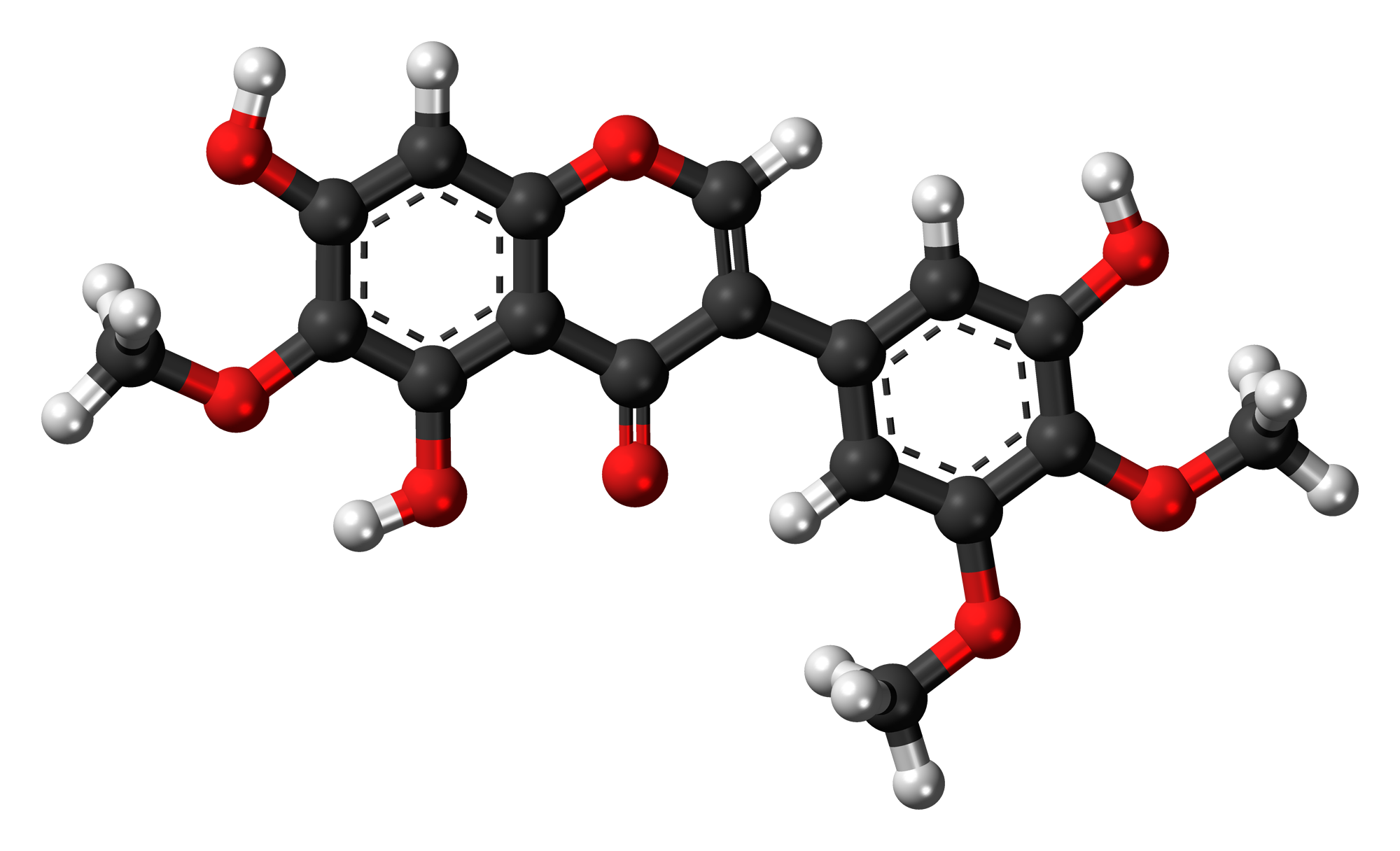

Names
- IUPAC name 3′,5,7-Trihydroxy-4′,5′,6-trimethoxyisoflavone
- Systematic IUPAC name 5,7-Dihydroxy-3-(3-hydroxy-4,5-dimethoxyphenyl)-6-methoxy-4H-1-benzopyran-4-one

Identifiers
CAS Number	548-76-5
3D model (JSmol)	Interactive image
ChEBI	CHEBI:81409
ChemSpider	4576563
ECHA InfoCard	100.008.145
PubChem CID	5464170
UNII	6O4NX37350
CompTox Dashboard (EPA)	DTXSID90203285
- InChI: InChI=1/C18H16O8/c1-23-13-5-8(4-10(19)17(13)24-2)9-7-26-12-6-11(20)18(25-3)16(22)14(12)15(9)21/h4-7,19-20,22H,1-3H3 Key: TUGWPJJTQNLKCL-UHFFFAOYAF
- SMILES: O=C\1c3c(O)c(OC)c(O)cc3O/C=C/1c2cc(O)c(OC)c(OC)c2

Properties
Chemical formula	C_{18}H_{16}O_{8}
Molar mass	360.31 g/mol
- Except where otherwise noted, data are given for materials in their standard state (at 25 °C [77 °F], 100 kPa). Infobox references

Irigenin is an O-methylated isoflavone, a type of flavonoid. It can be isolated from the rhizomes of the leopard lily (Belamcanda chinensis), and Iris kemaonensis.

== Glycosides ==
Iridin is the 7-glucoside of irigenin.
