= Capitophorus elaeagni =

Scientific classification
- Domain: Eukaryota
- Kingdom: Animalia
- Phylum: Arthropoda
- Class: Insecta
- Order: Hemiptera
- Suborder: Sternorrhyncha
- Family: Aphididae
- Tribe: Macrosiphini
- Genus: Capitophorus
- Species: C. elaeagni

Binomial name
- Capitophorus elaeagni (Del Guercio, 1894)

Species of true bug

Capitophorus elaeagni, known generally as artichoke aphid, is a species of aphid in the family Aphididae. Other common names include the thistle aphid and oleaster-thistle aphid. It is found in Europe.
