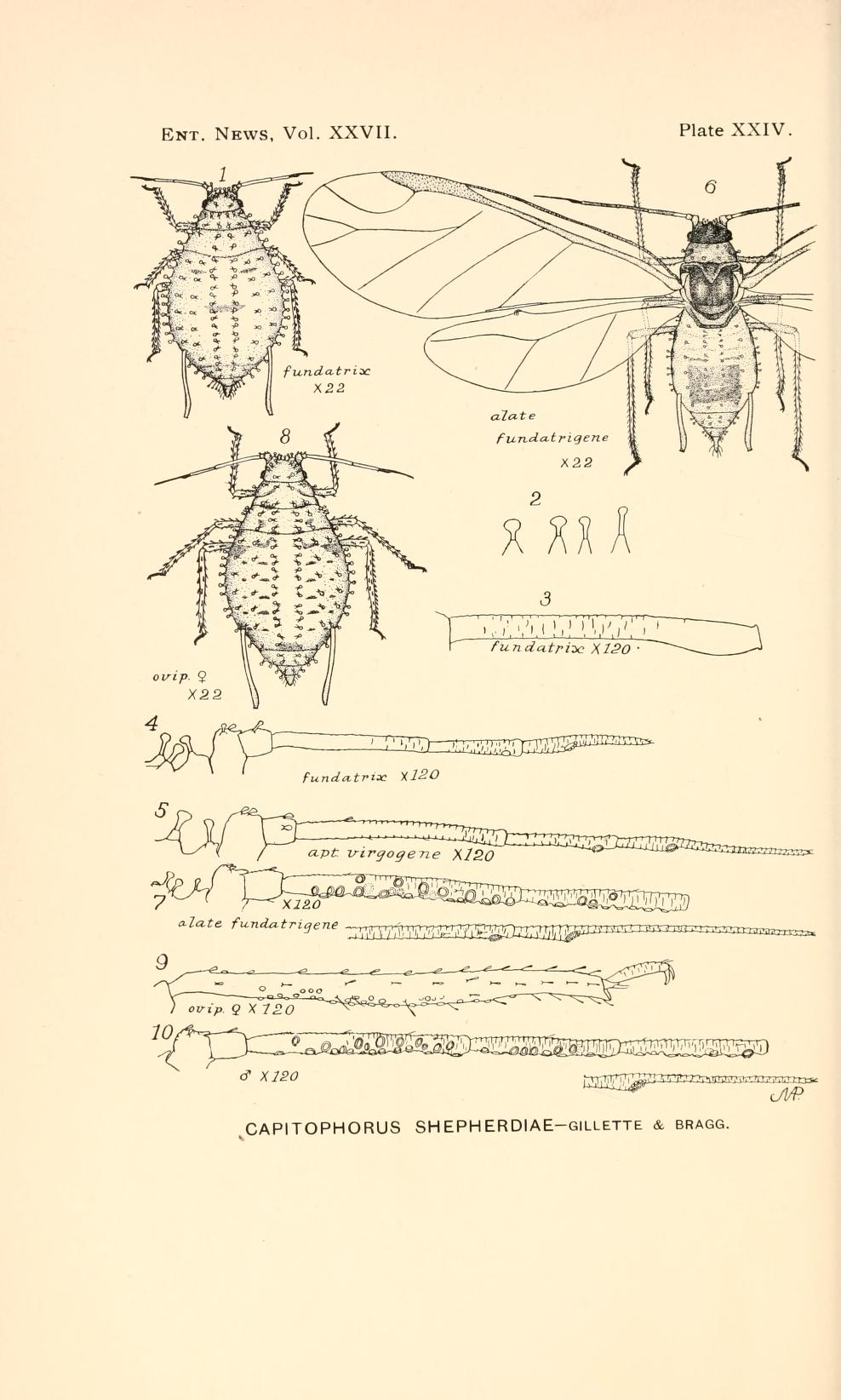

Scientific classification
- Domain: Eukaryota
- Kingdom: Animalia
- Phylum: Arthropoda
- Class: Insecta
- Order: Hemiptera
- Suborder: Sternorrhyncha
- Family: Aphididae
- Subfamily: Aphidinae
- Tribe: Macrosiphini
- Genus: Capitophorus van der Goot, 1913

= Capitophorus =

Genus of insects

Capitophorus is a genus of aphids in the family Aphididae. There are more than 30 described species in Capitophorus.

== Species ==
These 32 species belong to the genus Capitophorus:

- Capitophorus archangelskii Nevsky, 1928
- Capitophorus bulgaricus Tashev, 1964
- Capitophorus carduinus (Walker, 1850)
- Capitophorus cirsiiphagus Takahashi, 1961
- Capitophorus elaeagni (Del Guercio, 1894) (artichoke aphid)
- Capitophorus eniwanus Miyazaki, 1971
- Capitophorus essigi Hille Ris Lambers, 1953
- Capitophorus evelaeagni Zhang, 1980
- Capitophorus formosartemisiae (Takahashi, 1921)
- Capitophorus gnathalifoliae Shinji, 1924
- Capitophorus himachali Chakrabarti & Maity, 1980
- Capitophorus himalayensis Ghosh, Ghosh & Raychaudhuri, 1971
- Capitophorus hippophaes (Walker, 1852) (polygonum aphid)
- Capitophorus horni Börner, 1931
- Capitophorus hudsonicus Robinson, 1979
- Capitophorus inulae (Passerini, 1860)
- Capitophorus jopepperi Corpuz-Raros & Cook, 1974
- Capitophorus litanensis
- Capitophorus meghalayensis Basu & Raychaudhuri, 1976
- Capitophorus mitegoni Eastop, 1956
- Capitophorus montanus Takahashi, 1921
- Capitophorus pakansus Hottes & Frison, 1931
- Capitophorus prunifoliae Shinji, 1924
- Capitophorus rhamnoides Zhang, Chen, Zhong & Li, 1999
- Capitophorus rostratus
- Capitophorus shepherdiae Gillette & Bragg, 1916
- Capitophorus similis van der Goot, 1915
- Capitophorus takahashii Strand, 1925
- Capitophorus theobaldi
- Capitophorus tricholepidis Chakrabarti, 1976
- Capitophorus wojciechowskii Wieczorek & Kanturski, 2015
- Capitophorus xanthii (Oestlund, 1886)
