= Hippophae gyantsensis =

Scientific classification
- Kingdom: Plantae
- Clade: Tracheophytes
- Clade: Angiosperms
- Clade: Eudicots
- Clade: Rosids
- Order: Rosales
- Family: Elaeagnaceae
- Genus: Hippophae
- Species: H. gyantsensis

Binomial name
- Hippophae gyantsensis (Rousi) Y.S.Lian

Species of plant

Hippophae gyatsensis, is a plant species in the sea-buckthorn genus Hippophae endemic to the Qinghai-Tibet Plateau in China. These small hardy trees have good drought resistance, barren resistance, saline-alkali resistance and cold resistance, making them ideal for windbreak and sand-fixing forests.
