= Iridin =

Names
- IUPAC name 7-(β-D-Glucopyranosyloxy)-3′,5-dihydroxy-4′,5′,6-trimethoxyisoflavone
- Systematic IUPAC name 5-Hydroxy-3-(3-hydroxy-4,5-dimethoxyphenyl)-6-methoxy-7-{[(2S,3R,4S,5S,6R)-3,4,5-trihydroxy-6-(hydroxymethyl)oxan-2-yl]oxy}-4H-1-benzopyran-4-one
- Other names Irisin

Identifiers
CAS Number	491-74-7
3D model (JSmol)	Interactive image
ChEBI	CHEBI:5963
ChEMBL	ChEMBL487014
ChemSpider	4445090
KEGG	C10465
PubChem CID	5281777
UNII	6NTS007OHQ
CompTox Dashboard (EPA)	DTXSID80197689
- InChI: InChI=1S/C24H26O13/c1-32-13-5-9(4-11(26)22(13)33-2)10-8-35-12-6-14(23(34-3)19(29)16(12)17(10)27)36-24-21(31)20(30)18(28)15(7-25)37-24/h4-6,8,15,18,20-21,24-26,28-31H,7H2,1-3H3/t15-,18-,20+,21-,24-/m1/s1 Key: LNQCUTNLHUQZLR-OZJWLQQPSA-N; InChI=1/C24H26O13/c1-32-13-5-9(4-11(26)22(13)33-2)10-8-35-12-6-14(23(34-3)19(29)16(12)17(10)27)36-24-21(31)20(30)18(28)15(7-25)37-24/h4-6,8,15,18,20-21,24-26,28-31H,7H2,1-3H3/t15-,18-,20+,21-,24-/m1/s1 Key: LNQCUTNLHUQZLR-OZJWLQQPBX
- SMILES: COC1=CC(=CC(=C1OC)O)C2=COC3=CC(=C(C(=C3C2=O)O)OC)OC4C(C(C(C(O4)CO)O)O)O

Properties
Chemical formula	C_{24}H_{26}O_{13}
Molar mass	522.45 g/mol
Melting point	208 °C (406 °F; 481 K)
- Except where otherwise noted, data are given for materials in their standard state (at 25 °C [77 °F], 100 kPa). verify (what is ?) Infobox references

Iridin is an isoflavone, a type of flavonoid. It is the 7-glucoside of irigenin and can be isolated from several species of irises like orris root, Iris florentina or Iris versicolor, also commonly known as the larger blue flag. It can also be found in Iris kemaonensis.

The compound is toxic and these plants have been mentioned as causing poisoning in humans and animals.
