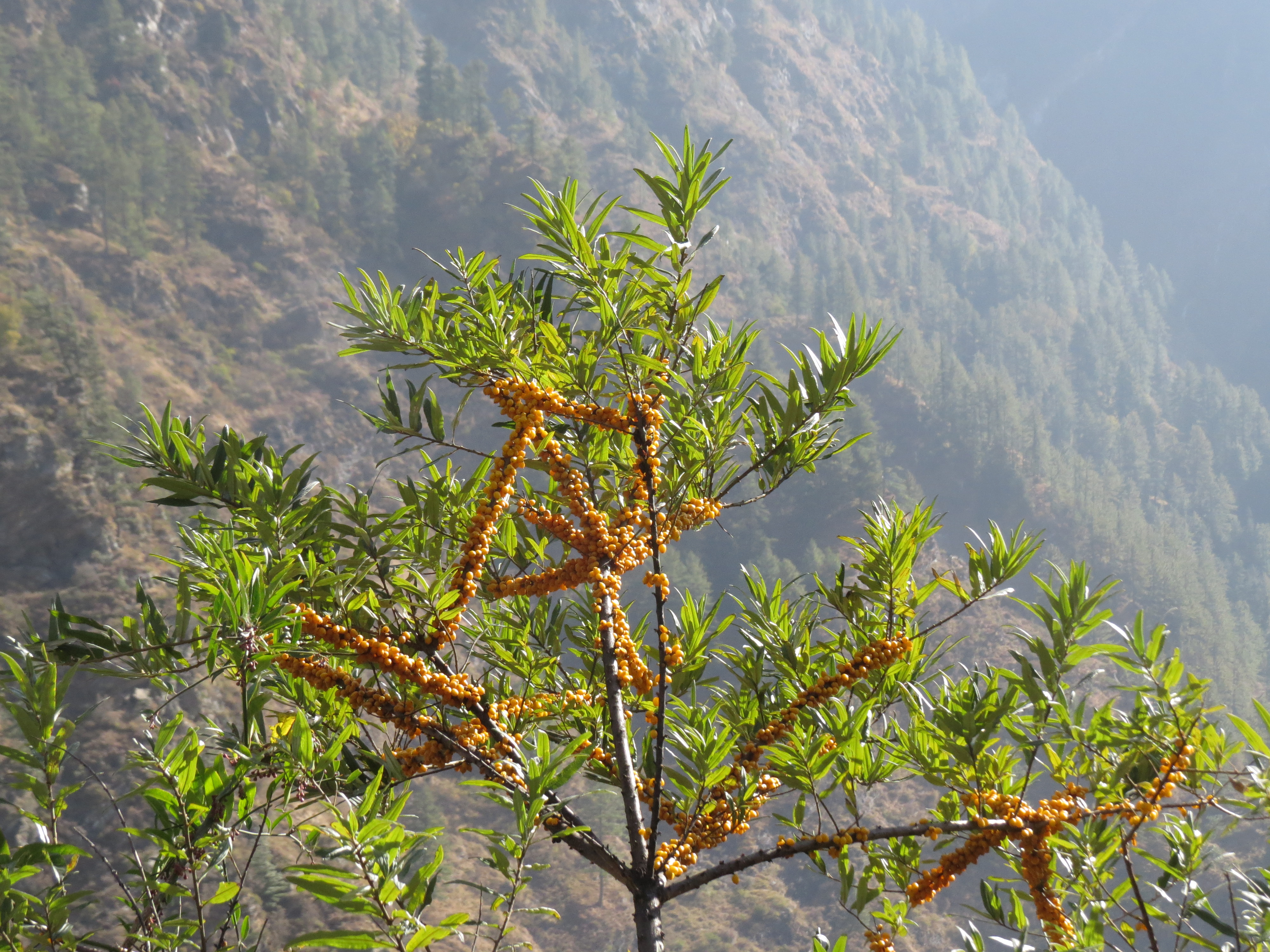

Scientific classification
- Kingdom: Plantae
- Clade: Embryophytes
- Clade: Tracheophytes
- Clade: Angiosperms
- Clade: Eudicots
- Clade: Rosids
- Order: Rosales
- Family: Elaeagnaceae
- Genus: Hippophae
- Species: H. salicifolia

Binomial name
- Hippophae salicifolia D.Don

= Hippophae salicifolia =

Species of flowering plant

Hippophae salicifolia, commonly known as the willow-leaved sea buckthorn, is a Himalayan plant species in the genus Hippophae.

== Description ==
It is a deciduous low shrub or small tree growing to 7 metres (23 feet) with small leaves 1–3 centimetres (1/2–1 1/4 inches) long. Small flowers bloom in June.

It has distinct dioecious characteristics with an XY sex-determination system that has been studied through its genome sequencing.

== Etymology ==
The genus name Hippophae comes from Ancient Greek ἵππος (híppos), meaning 'horse', and φάος (pháos), meaning 'light', and refers to the use of sea buckthorn leaves as horse fodder to make their coats shine. The specific epithet comes from Latin salix, meaning 'willow', and folium, meaning 'leaf'.

== Distribution and habitat and habitat ==
It is found in the Himalayas, growing at high altitudes.

It grows easily in sun and prevents erosion, but will soon die out in shade.

== Uses ==
The sour fruits are edible, becoming less acidic but very soft as winter progresses. The fruit is made into jam and made into oil and medicinal products.
