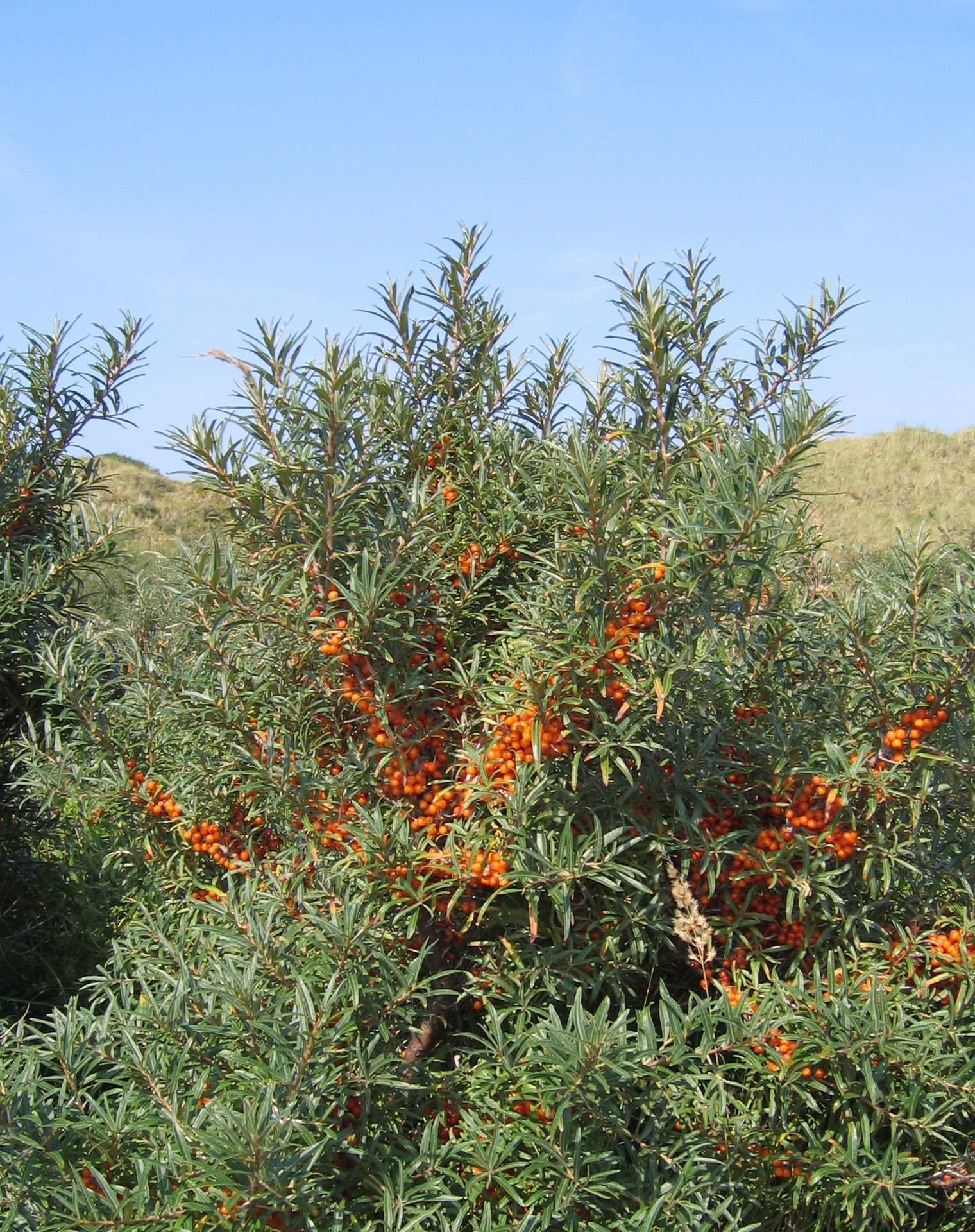
- Sea-buckthorn at IJmuiden, Netherlands

Scientific classification
- Kingdom: Plantae
- Clade: Embryophytes
- Clade: Tracheophytes
- Clade: Angiosperms
- Clade: Eudicots
- Clade: Rosids
- Order: Rosales
- Family: Elaeagnaceae
- Genus: Hippophae
- Species: H. rhamnoides

Binomial name
- Hippophae rhamnoides L.

Synonyms
- Argussiera rhamnoides (L.) Bubani; Elaeagnus rhamnoides (L.) A.Nelson; Hippophaes rhamnoideum (L.) St.-Lag.; Rhamnoides hippophae Moench; Osyris rhamnoides (L.) Scop.

= Sea buckthorn =

Species of flowering plant

Sea-buckthorn (Hippophae rhamnoides), also known as sea buckthorn, sandthorn, sallowthorn or seaberry, is a species of flowering plant in the family Elaeagnaceae, native to cold-temperate regions of Eurasia. It is a spiny deciduous shrub. The fruit has culinary uses, while its extracts, including its oil, are used in the cosmetics industry and within traditional medicine. It is also used as animal fodder, in horticulture, and for ecological purposes.

== Description and biology ==
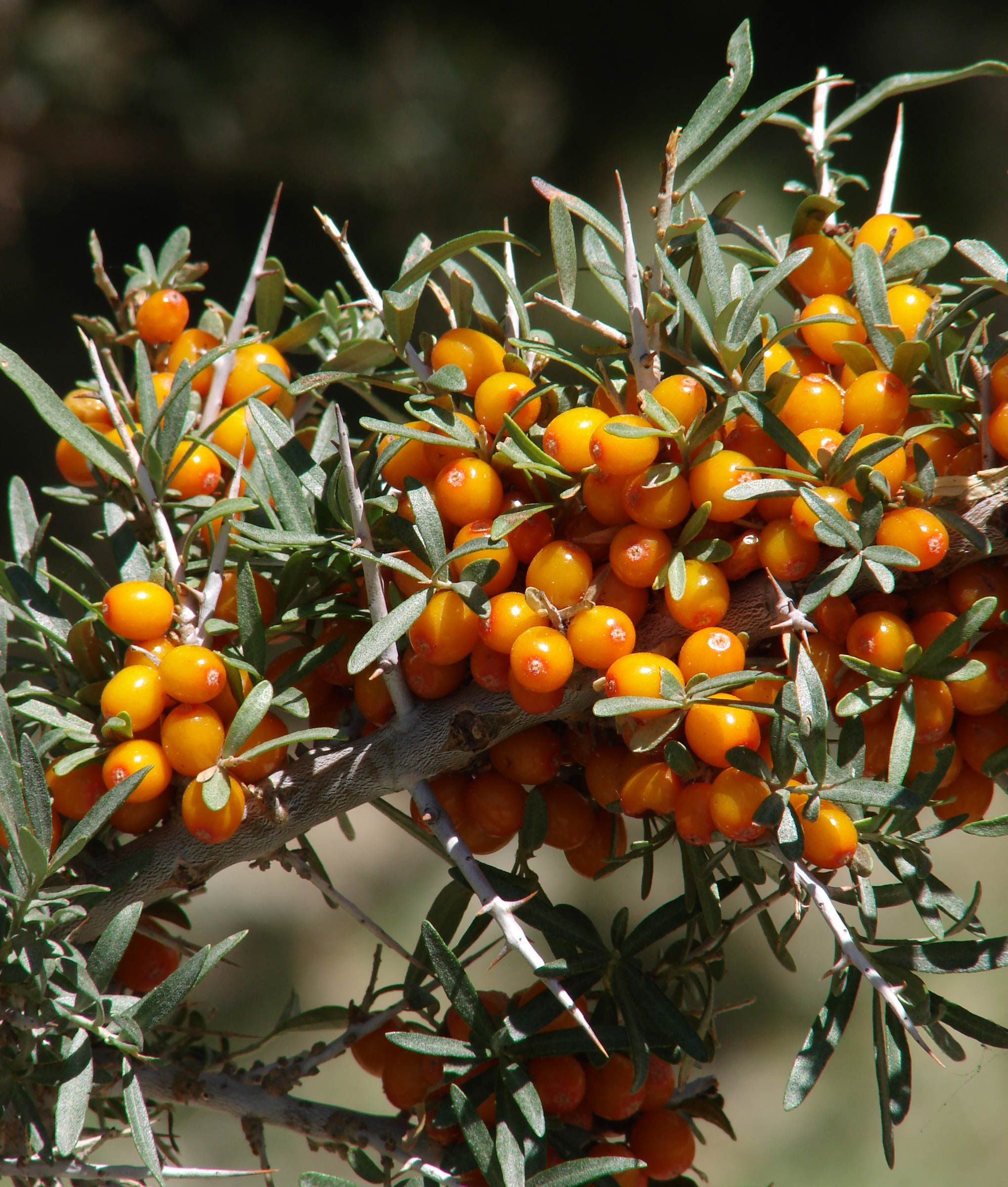
Sea-buckthorn leaves, thorns, and berries

Sea-buckthorn is a hardy, deciduous suckering shrub that can grow between 2–5 metres (6 ft 7 in – 16 ft 5 in) high, rarely 15 m (49 ft), forming extensive clonal colonies by root sprouts. It has rough, brown or black bark and a thick crown of greyish-green foliage. Like many species of the family Elaeagnaceae, the young shoots and leaves are covered in small silvery scales. The leaves are alternate, narrow and lanceolate, 1–8 cm long and up to 1 cm broad with silvery-green surfaces at first; the upper side darkens to mid to dark grey-green through the summer as the scales wear off, while the underside remains silvery. It is dioecious, with male and female flowers growing on different shrubs. The sex of seedlings can only be determined at the first flowering, which mostly occurs after three years. The male inflorescence is built up of four to six apetalous flowers, while the female inflorescence normally consists of only one apetalous flower and contains one ovary and one ovule. Fertilisation occurs solely via wind pollination, so male plants need to be close to female plants to allow for fertilisation and fruit production.

The globose to oval fruit are 6–8 mm diameter, grow in compact dense clusters, and are typically bright orange, but vary from pale yellow to dark orange. The individual fruit weigh between 270 and 480 mg.

The plants have a developed and extensive root system, and the roots live in symbiosis with nitrogen-fixing Frankia bacteria. The roots also transform insoluble organic and mineral matters from the soil into more soluble states. Vegetative reproduction of the plants occurs rapidly via root suckers.

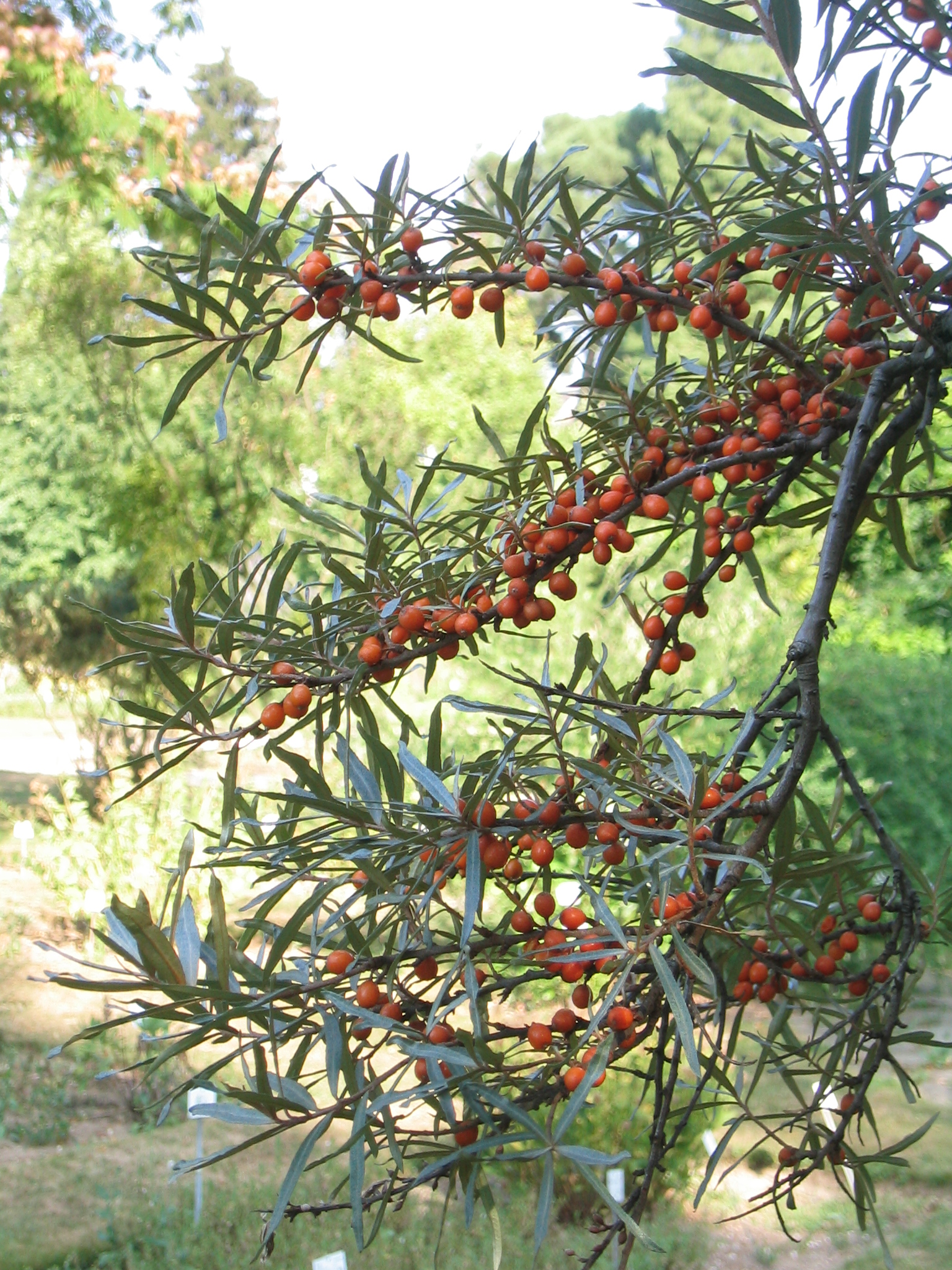
Sea-buckthorn berries

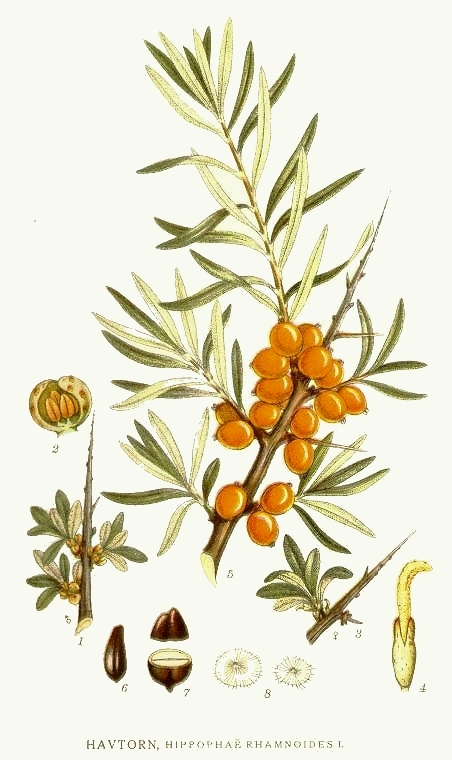
1901 illustration by the Swedish botanist C. A. M. Lindman

=== Fruit ===
The fruit contains sugars, sugar alcohols, fruit acids, vitamins, polyphenols, carotenoids, fibre, amino acids, minerals, and plant sterols. Species belonging to genus Hippophae accumulate oil both in the pulp and in seed of the fruit. Oil content in the pulp is 1.5–3.0%, while in seeds, oil is 11% of the fresh weight.

Major sugars in sea-buckthorn fruit are fructose and glucose, with total sugar content of 2.7–5.3 g/100 ml of juice. The typical sourness of the fruit is due to high content of malic acid (0.8–3.2 g/100 ml of juice) while astringency is related to quinic acid (1.2–2.1 g/100 ml of juice). Major sugar alcohol in fruit is L-quebrachitol (0.15–0.24 g/100 ml of juice).

=== Phytochemicals ===
The fruit is rich in phytosterols (340–520 mg/kg), β-sitosterol being the major sterol compound as it constitutes 57–83% of total sterols.

Flavonols were found to be the predominating class of phenolic compounds, while phenolic acids and flavan-3-ols (catechins) represent minor components.

== Taxonomy ==
Hippophae rhamnoides is in the family Elaeagnaceae in the order Rosales.

=== Subspecies ===
Seven subspecies are accepted, with three in Europe and four more in Asia. The subspecies vary in size, shape, number of main lateral veins in the leaves and quantity and colour of stellate hairs. The central Asian subspecies grow much taller; the European subsp. rhamnoides only reaches 5 m, but the Chinese subspecies are reported to reach 15 m to even 18 m tall.

- Hippophae rhamnoides subsp. carpatica Rousi — Carpathian Mountains in central and eastern Europe
- Hippophae rhamnoides subsp. caucasica Rousi — southeastern Europe (Bulgaria), southwestern Asia in Iran, Turkey and the Caucasus Mountains
- Hippophae rhamnoides subsp. mongolica Rousi — east-central Asia
- Hippophae rhamnoides subsp. rhamnoides — northern & western Europe
- Hippophae rhamnoides subsp. turkestanica Rousi — west-central Asia
- Hippophae rhamnoides subsp. wolongensis Y.S.Lian, K.Sun & X.L.Chen — central China
- Hippophae rhamnoides subsp. yunnanensis Rousi — southwestern China, Tibet

An eighth subspecies Hippophae rhamnoides subsp. fluviatilis Soest is accepted by the Euro+Med-Plantbase, but treated by POWO as a synonym of nominate subsp. rhamnoides. This is claimed to have fewer thorns than other subspecies, and is used for breeding, due to easier harvesting methods.

== Etymology ==
The genus name Hippophae comes from Ancient Greek ἵππος (híppos), meaning 'horse', and φάος (pháos), meaning 'light', and is due to the ancient Greeks use of sea-buckthorn leaves as horse fodder to make their coats shine more. The specific epithet rhamnoides derives from Rhamnus plus -oides, resembling, referring to the superficial similarity to the buckthorn genus Rhamnus.

== Distribution ==
Hippophae rhamnoides is native to cold-temperate regions of Europe and Asia, between 27° and 69°N latitude and 7°W and 122°E longitude. These regions include the North Sea coasts of Great Britain, the Netherlands, and Denmark, the Baltic coasts of Finland, Poland, Latvia, and Germany, the Gulf of Bothnia in Sweden, as well as coastal areas of the United Kingdom, Norway and the Netherlands. In Asia, H. rhamnoides can be found in the northern regions of China, throughout most of the Himalayan region, including India, Nepal and Bhutan, Pakistan and Afghanistan. It is found in a variety of locations: on hills and hillsides, valleys, riverbeds, along coastal regions, on islands, in small isolated or continuous pure stands, but also in mixed stands with other shrub and tree species. H. rhamnoides has also recently been planted in countries such as Canada, the United States, Bolivia, Chile, Japan and South Korea.

The current total area of H. rhamnoides is about 3.0 million ha worldwide. This number includes both wild and cultivated plants. Of these, approximately 2.5 million ha are situated in China (1.0 million ha of wild plants and 1.5 million ha in plantations), 20 000 ha in Mongolia, 12 000 ha in India and 3 000 ha in Pakistan. This makes China the largest agricultural producer of H. rhamnoides. Approximately 10 000 acres of the plant are planted in China each year for berry production as well as eco-environmental improvement. As of 2003, approximately 100 km of field shelterbelts were planted in Canada each year, and over 250 000 mature fruit-producing plants were grown on the Canadian prairies with an estimated annual fruit supply of 750 000 kg. Other countries that grow H. rhamnoides as an agricultural plant include for example Germany and France.

== Ecology ==
It is particularly drought- and salt-tolerant and can thus be successfully used for land reclamation, against further soil erosion, as shelterbelt or in agroforestry. These characteristics are mainly due to the deep root system that the plant develops. For example, in eastern China, new agroforestry systems have been developed to reclaim land with high salinity contents and H. rhamnoides is included in the system as shelterbelt, providing a habitat to different birds and small mammals.

=== Wildlife habitat and conservation ===
Sea-buckthorn provides habitats for various wildlife species. Its dense bushes offer shelter, while its nutrient-rich berries serve as a food source for birds and small mammals. The berries are eaten by thrushes, particularly fieldfares, and warblers like blackcaps and common whitethroats, and also by larger species like magpies. In regions like Ladakh, these shrubs support a range of native wildlife, providing both cover and food for birds and small mammals. In the Canadian prairies, species such as sharp-tailed grouse, grey partridge, and common pheasants rely on sea-buckthorn for food and shelter. Its importance as a wildlife habitat has been documented across multiple regions, highlighting its role in promoting biodiversity.

=== Soil ===
Sea-buckthorn may enhance soil physicochemical properties, particularly through its ability to fix nitrogen in specialised root nodules, contributing to increased soil fertility and productivity over time. Nitrogen fixation in sea-buckthorn occurs through a symbiotic relationship with Frankia bacteria, which add an estimated 180 kg of nitrogen per hectare annually to the soil. This process supports soil fertility by increasing nitrogen content, along with added phosphorus and organic matter.

The plant's root system is extensive and efficient, with taproots reaching depths of up to 4 metres, while horizontal roots spread up to 10 metres. It stimulates soil microbial activity through exudates and organic matter from fallen leaves and plant residues, enhancing soil health overall.

Additionally, as sea-buckthorn plantations age, soil fertility improves, evidenced by elevated carbon and nitrogen accumulation This progressive soil enhancement makes sea-buckthorn valuable for land restoration, particularly in degraded temperate regions.

=== Land reclamation ===
Sea-buckthorn can be used for land reclamation, alongside trees like pine, larch, black locust, alder, sycamore maple, manna ash, silverberry, and wild privet. Its strong root system effectively stabilises slopes, reduces surface runoff, and controls sediment transport, particularly in areas prone to erosion from rainstorms.

== Uses ==
=== Nutrition ===
The fruit has a high vitamin C content, approximately 400 mg per 100 grams. Additionally, the fruit has high concentrations of vitamin E and vitamin K. The berries also contain vitamin B12.

The main carotenoid is the provitamin A, beta-carotene, while other carotenoids include zeaxanthin, and lycopene.

The most prevalent dietary minerals in sea-buckthorn fruit are potassium (300–380 mg/100 g), manganese (0.28–0.32 mg/100 g), and copper (0.1 mg/100 g).

=== Culinary ===
The berries are usually washed and then pressed, resulting in pomace and juice. The fruit pomace can be used to obtain oil, natural food colour (yellow/orange) or jam, while the juice is further processed and packaged. The leaves of the shrub can be air dried, eventually ground, and used for tea.

=== Other uses ===
Because of its tolerance against strongly eroded, nutrient-poor and sometimes salty soils, the plant has been used for land reclamation or as shelterbelt. Hippophae rhamnoides leaves and fruit residues (left after oil extraction) can be used for feeding livestock, such as for poultry. The weight of livestock and poultry has been shown to increase considerably after being fed sea buckthorn.

Parts of the sea buckthorn plant are applied in traditional medicine, particularly in Russia and Northeast Asia. H. rhamnoides oil may be used to produce cosmetics, such as hand cream, shampoo or massage oils.

== Cultivation ==
=== Soil and climate requirements ===
In nature H. rhamnoides is found growing profusely on a wide range of soil types, but does better in soils with a light physical structure, rich in nutrient compounds and with a pH near neutral (pH 6.5–7.5). Best growth occurs in deep, well drained, sandy loam with ample organic matter. Light, sandy soils have low water carrying capacity and are also low in nutrient mineral elements; so without the previous addition of organic matter, are not appropriate. Similarly inappropriate are clayey soils, with high density and water retention characteristics.

H. rhamnoides is considered drought resistant, but it is a moisture-sensitive plant especially in the spring when plants are flowering and young fruit are beginning to develop. Planting in arid or semiarid areas is possible, if water is supplied for establishment. It can bear fruit at altitudes up to 2000 m above sea level. The plant can withstand temperatures from −43 °C to + 40 °C. Vegetation begins at average daily air temperatures of 5 to 7 °C. It flowers at temperatures 10 to 15 °C and requires total effective temperatures, spring to harvest time, of 14.5 °C to 17.5 °C, depending on latitude, elevation and species. Frost hardiness is the highest in deep dormancy in November and December. During this period, negative temperatures of −50 °C may be tolerated. Whereas in the post-dormant period in January to March, the critical temperature drops in air temperature for the male to −30 °C to −35 °C and for the female, −40 °C to −45 °C. H. rhamnoides can only be grown in well-lit, unshaded areas. Starting from its earliest stage of development, it cannot tolerate shade. As for fertilisation, phosphorus is indispensable for the normal life processes of the nodules on the roots. The plant requires little nitrogen, due to its ability to fix nitrogen.

=== Planting ===
Hippophae rhamnoides needs a period of 4 to 5 years from the appearance of the first shoots from the seeds to the beginning of fruit and peaks at the 7–8th year of plant life, remaining productive for 30 years with intermittent pruning. Spring is the best time for planting H. rhamnoides. An orchard planting can yield 10 tonnes of berries per hectare. A number of seeds per planting site is recommended at spacing of 1 m within the row and 4 m between the rows, south-east sloping terrain is recommended to facilitate the maximum sunlight exposure and rows should be oriented in a north– south direction to provide maximum light.

=== Propagation ===
Seed propagation is not commonly used in orchards because the species is dioecious, therefore the sex cannot be determined in the seed, or prior to 3 to 4 years of growth. Male plants must be replaced. If seedlings of unknown sex are planted, it may result in an uneven distribution of male and female plants. To avoid this problem, excessive male plants are replaced with female plants, or vegetative propagation from mature plants of known sex is done. With vegetative propagation, the cuttings will bear fruit 1 to 2 years earlier than seed propagated trees and the genetics and sex are known from the mother plant.

Sea-buckthorn can be propagated using either hardwood or softwood cuttings, root cuttings, layering and suckers. Cross-pollination is by wind action only. The ratio and distance of male to female plants is important, as the number of female trees in each planting directly affects the total yield. Recommendations for male and female ratio vary from 6 to 12%, while the distance within which the female plant can be pollinated is about 100 m (330 ft). It has been shown that as the distance from the female plant to the male plant (polliniser) increases (64m), the yield of the female plant decreases.

=== Breeding ===
The large morphological diversity is a good indication for opportunities in selection of desired characteristics for a given region. Mass selection is still practiced in many areas, although it is gradually replaced by hybridisation and polyploidy breeding. The most important characteristics that need improvement are: yield, fruit size, winter hardness, thornlessness, fruit and pollen quality and early maturity, long pedicel (to facilitate mechanical harvest) and nitrogen fixing ability.

=== Harvesting and challenges in mechanisation ===
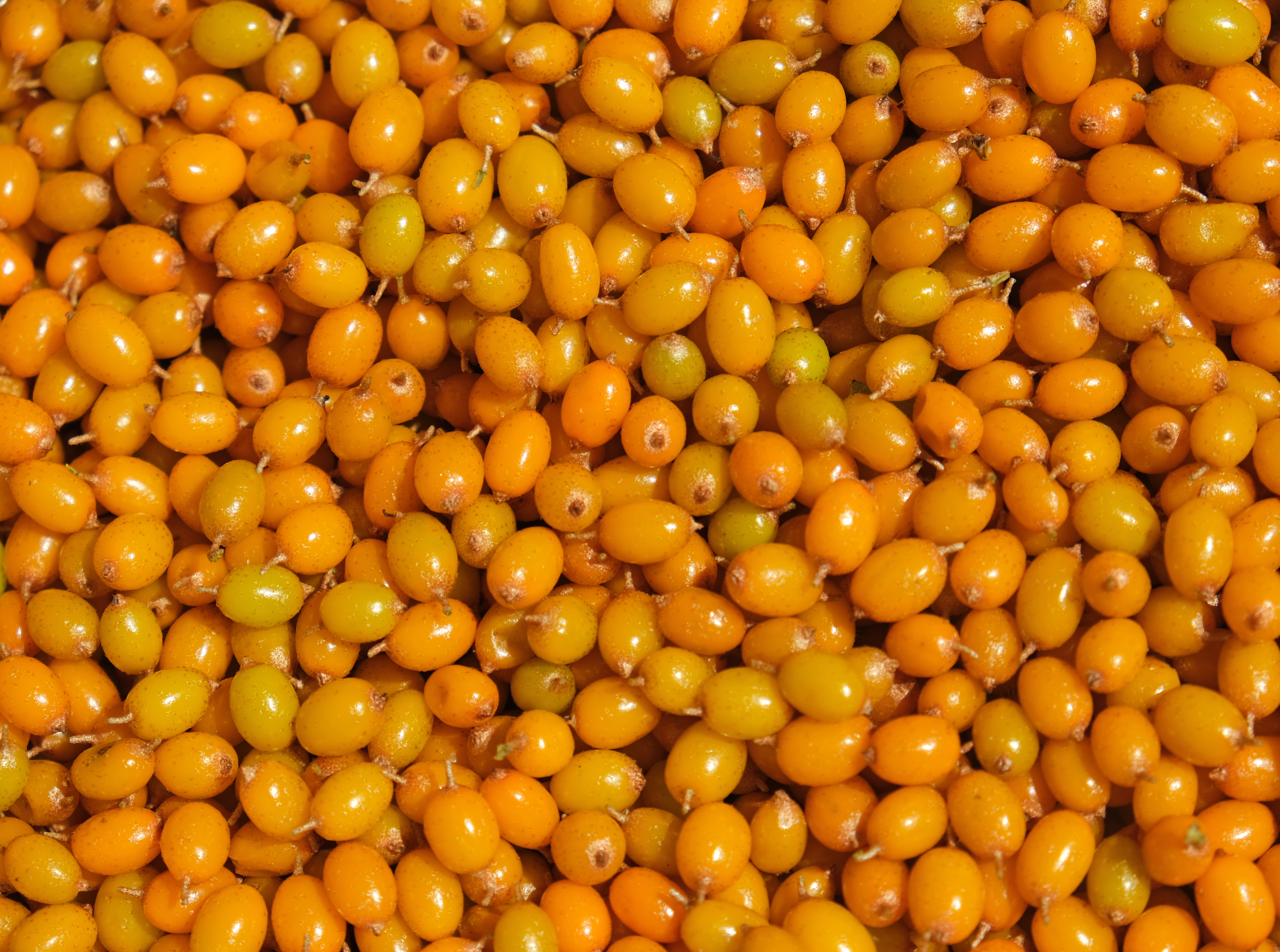
Harvested sea-buckthorn berries.

The fruit ripens in the autumn, and frequently clings on the shrub until the following spring. An orchard planting of about 2,500 trees per hectare, having a 1:7 male-to-female ratio and 4 metres (13 ft) between rows with 1 metre (3 ft 3 in) between plants, should yield approximately 10 tonnes. Good plants will produce up to 7 kilograms (15 lb) annually. In Asia, the fruit is harvested by hand, requiring about 1500 person-hours per hectare. Fruit harvest is the most time-consuming operation in growing H. rhamnoides. The relatively small fruit size, short pedicel, force required to pull off each fruit, the density of fruit on the branch, and the thorniness of the plant, are main disadvantages during harvesting.

Difficulties in harvesting are the major barriers of orchard production and development of the plant's potential as a cash crop. Harvesting the fruit is problematic because the fruit does not easily release from the stem. Different mechanical harvest methods were developed in the late 20th century, such as shaking, vacuum and quick-freezing, which caused fruit and bark damage and low yield. Except when frozen on the shrub, fresh fruit mechanical harvesting is still in the development stage during the early 21st century. This is mainly due to the difficulty in separating the stem (pedicel) from the berry (pericarp). Mechanical harvesting – with the sequence of cutting a branch from the tree, freezing it, then shaking the branch to release the berries – eliminates the necessity for maintenance pruning, leaving a hedge that has been uniformly cut back, with high-quality berries. A trunk clamp-on vibrator harvester may be used when the fruit is frozen on the shrub, but with this method leaf and wood contamination is high, and an additional step of berry cleaning is necessary.

=== Cultivars ===
In the United Kingdom, the cultivars 'Leikora' and 'Pollmix' have won the Royal Horticultural Society's Award of Garden Merit. 'Leikora' is a dense-fruit cultivar, while 'Pollmix' is used as a pollinator for female clones. Cultivar Sprite has dense, compact vines growing to 2 feet (0.61 m) tall and wide, characteristics possibly making it useful as a low hedge near the sea.

== Interactions ==
=== Symbionts ===
Hippophae rhamnoides plants that are 1–2 years old develop root nodules containing actinobacteria of the genus Frankia, which are capable of fixing nitrogen. As a result of this relationship, the soils in stands of H. rhamnoides are enriched in nitrogen. The nitrogen-fixing activity of the symbiotic bacteria is not constant, but depends on external factors such as the climate or whether additional nitrogen fertilisation occurred.

=== Diseases and insect pests ===
Both in Asia and in Europe, sea buckthorn losses occur notably due to environmental stress, wilt disease and insect pests. It is estimated that more than 60,000 ha of natural and planted sea buckthorn stands have died in China since the year 2000 due to these three factors, and approximately 5,000 ha perish each year.

==== Wilt disease ====
Wilt disease is a combination of fungal diseases that is sometimes also called "dried-shrink disease", "shrivelled disease", "dry rot" or "dry atrophy". In China, it causes fruit yield losses of 30–40% and annual losses of mature plantations of 4 000 ha. Several pathogens have been described as causing the sickness in sea buckthorn:

- the genus Fusarium (Fusarium wilt): F. acuminatum, F. camptoceras and F. oxysporum, as well as F. rhizoctonia and F. solani and F. sporotrichioides
- the genus Stigmina
- the genus Verticillium (Verticillium wilt): V. albo-atrum and V. dahliae
- the species Plowrightia hippophaes
- the species Phellinus hippophaeicola
- the species Phomopsis spp.

Methods to control the disease include removing and burning infected branches, not replanting H. rhamnoides at the same site for 3–5 years, and avoiding to make cuttings from infected plants. Antagonistic fungi like Trichoderma sp. or Penicillium sp. can be used to combat wilt disease in plants infected by Plowrightia hippophaes. Additionally, four strains of Cladothrix actinomyces were found to be usable as antagonistic fungi in H. rhamnoides plants infected by Fusarium sporotrichioides. Cultivars of H. rhamnoides that were relatively resistant to wilt disease have also been identified.

==== Pests ====
Hippophae rhamnoides is affected by several insect pests, of which green aphids (Capitophorus hippophaes) are one of the most damaging. They are usually found in the new growth on shoot tips where they stunt growth and cause yellowing of the leaves. This is then followed by shrinking of the leaves along their central vein, after which they drop prematurely. Another serious pest is the seabuckthorn fruit fly (Rhagoletis batava), whose larvae feed on the fruit flesh, rendering the fruit unsuitable for use. H. rhamnoides is also affected by the gall tick (Vasates spp.), which causes gall formation on the leaves and thereby leads to deformation of the leaf surface. Both the leaf roller (Archips rosana) and the spongy moth (Lymantria dispar) chew on H. rhamnoides leaves. The leaf roller occurs from May to July, while the spongy moth occurs later in the summer. Further insect pests include the commashaped scale (Chionaspis salicis), which sucks sap from the bark and can cause important damage by leading to the death of the plant, and the larvae of the sea buckthorn moth (Gelechia hippophaella), which penetrate into fresh buds and feed on them. Thrips, and occasionally earwigs have also been observed as affecting H. rhamnoides.

Insecticides such as gammaxene and dylox are used to control insect pests in the soil, and insecticide soap can be employed against green aphid infestations

Hippophae rhamnoides is also involved in interactions with various animals (birds, rodents, deer, livestock) that can lead to damage in plantations.

=== Weed control ===
Weed control is important, especially during the early growth stages of H. rhamnoides, since it grows slower than weeds due to its less vigorous root system. Weeds should be removed before planting by preparing the land adequately, and they should subsequently be controlled during the first four to five years, until the shrubs are high enough to shade out the weeds. Weed control is done both mechanically and manually. Weeding should however not be too deep so as not to damage the root system of H. rhamnoides.

As of 2003, no herbicides were registered for use in orchards of H. rhamnoides.

== See also ==
- Hippophae
