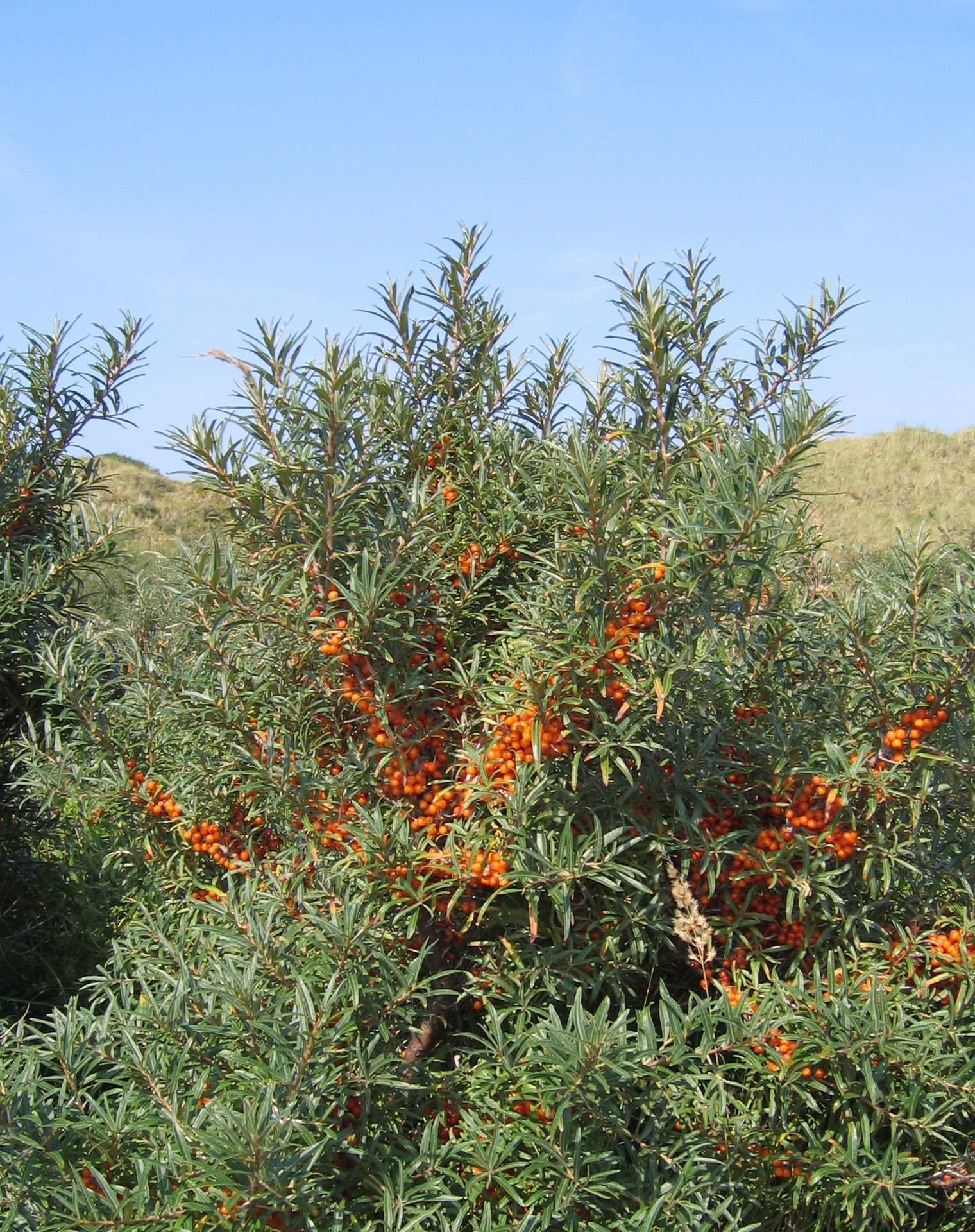
- Common sea buckthorn shrub in the Netherlands

Scientific classification
- Kingdom: Plantae
- Clade: Embryophytes
- Clade: Tracheophytes
- Clade: Spermatophytes
- Clade: Angiosperms
- Clade: Eudicots
- Clade: Rosids
- Order: Rosales
- Family: Elaeagnaceae
- Genus: Hippophae; L.

Type species
- Hippophae rhamnoides

Species
- See text

Synonyms
- Argussiera Bubani; Hippophaes Asch.; Oleaster Heist. ex Fabr.; Rhamnoides Mill.

= Hippophae =

Genus of flowering plants including sea buckthorn

Hippophae is a genus of flowering plants in the family Elaeagnaceae. They are deciduous shrubs. They are exceptionally hardy plants, able to withstand winter temperatures as low as −43 °C (−45 °F). As Hippophae species develop an aggressive and extensive root system, they are planted to inhibit soil erosion and used in land reclamation for their nitrogen fixing properties, wildlife habitat, and soil enrichment. Hippophae berries and leaves are manufactured into various human and animal food and skincare products.

== Species and description ==
The shrubs reach 0.5–6 m (1 ft 8 in – 19 ft 8 in) tall, rarely up to 10 metres (33 ft) in central Asia. The leaf arrangement can be alternate or opposite. 'Plants of the World Online includes the following species:

- Hippophae × goniocarpa Y.S.Lian & al. ex Swenson & Bartish is a natural hybrid of H. neurocarpa and H. sinensis which grows in mountainous regions in Nepal, Mongolia and China.
- Hippophae gyantsensis (Rousi) Y.S.Lian
- Hippophae litangensis Y.S.Lian & Xue L.Chen ex Swenson & Bartish
- Hippophae neurocarpa S.W.Liu & T.N.He
- Hippophae rhamnoides L.: Common sea buckthorn has dense and stiff branches, and is very thorny. The leaves are a distinct pale silvery-green, lanceolate, 3–8 cm (1–3 in) long, and less than 7 mm (1/4 in) broad. It is dioecious, with separate male and female plants. The male produces brownish flowers which produce wind-distributed pollen. The female plants produce orange berries 6–9 mm (1/4–3/8 in) in diameter, soft, juicy, and rich in oils. The roots distribute rapidly and extensively, providing a nonleguminous nitrogen fixation role in surrounding soils.
- Hippophae salicifolia D.Don (willow-leaved sea buckthorn) is restricted to the Himalayas, to the south of the common sea buckthorn, growing at high altitudes in dry valleys; it differs from H. rhamnoides in having broader (to 10 mm (3/8 in)) and greener (less silvery) leaves, and yellow berries. A wild variant occurs in the same area, but at even higher altitudes in the alpine zone. It is a low shrub not growing taller than 1 m (3 ft 3 in) with small leaves 1–3 cm (1/2–1 1/4 in) long.
- Hippophae sinensis (Rousi) Tzvelev
- Hippophae tibetana Schltdl.

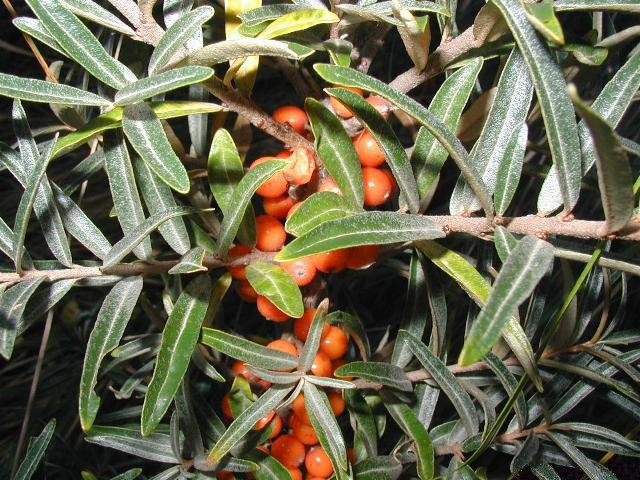
Common sea buckthorn

== Taxonomy and name ==
Hippophae is a small genus of Elaeagnaceae having a terminal taxon with seven species recognized, as of 2002. Hippophae rhamnoides is a highly variable species with eight subspecies.

The genus name Hippophae comes from Ancient Greek ἵππος (híppos), meaning 'horse', and φάος (pháos), meaning 'light', and is due to the ancient greeks use of sea buckthorn leaves as horse fodder to make their coats shine more.

== Distribution ==
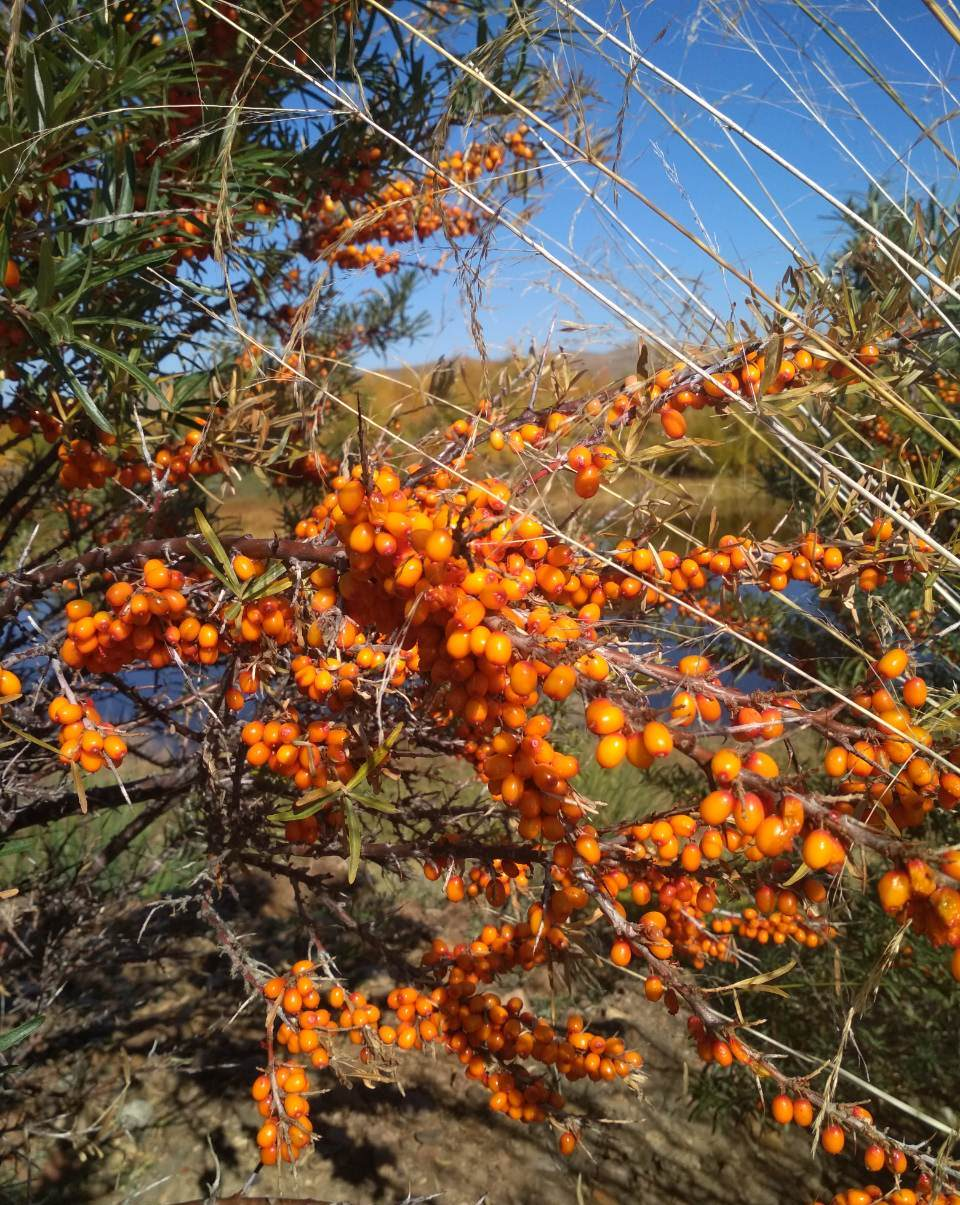
Ripe berries of sea-buckthorn. Selenginsky district, Buryatia, Russia

Hippophae rhamnoides, the common sea buckthorn, is the most widespread of the species in the genus, with the ranges of its eight subspecies extending from the Atlantic coasts of Europe across to northwestern Mongolia, northwestern China and Northern Pakistan. In western Europe, it is largely confined to sea coasts where salt spray off the sea prevents other larger plants from outcompeting it. In central Asia, it is more widespread in dry semi-desert sites where other plants cannot survive the dry conditions.

In central Europe and Asia, it also occurs as a sub-alpine shrub above the tree line in mountains, and other sunny areas such as river banks where it has been used to stabilize erosion. They are tolerant of salt in the air and soil, but demand full sunlight for good growth and do not tolerate shady conditions near larger trees. They typically grow in dry, sandy areas.

More than 90% or about 1,500,000 ha (3,700,000 acres) of the world's natural sea buckthorn habitat is found in China, Mongolia, Russia, and most parts of Northern Europe.

Sea buckthorn USDA hardiness zones are about 3 through 7.

In some areas it is considered invasive, due to its ability to outcompete smaller native species.

== Varieties ==
Between 1945 and 1991, Soviet and German horticulturists developed new varieties with greater nutritional value, larger berries, different ripening months and branches that are easier to harvest. Over the past 20 years, experimental crops have been grown in the United States, one in Nevada and one in Arizona, and in several provinces of Canada.

== Genetics ==
A study of nuclear ribosomal internal transcribed spacer sequence data showed that the genus can be divided into three clades:

- H. tibetana
- H. rhamnoides with the exception of H. rhamnoides ssp. gyantsensis (=H. gyantsensis)
- remaining species

A study using chloroplast sequences and morphology, however, recovered only two clades:

- H. tibetana, H. gyantsensis, H. salicifolia, H. neurocarpa
- H. rhamnoides

== Natural history ==
The fruit is an important winter food resource for some birds, notably fieldfares.

Leaves are eaten by the larva of the coastal race of the ash pug moth and by larvae of other Lepidoptera, including brown-tail, dun-bar, emperor moth, mottled umber, and Coleophora elaeagnisella.

== Uses ==
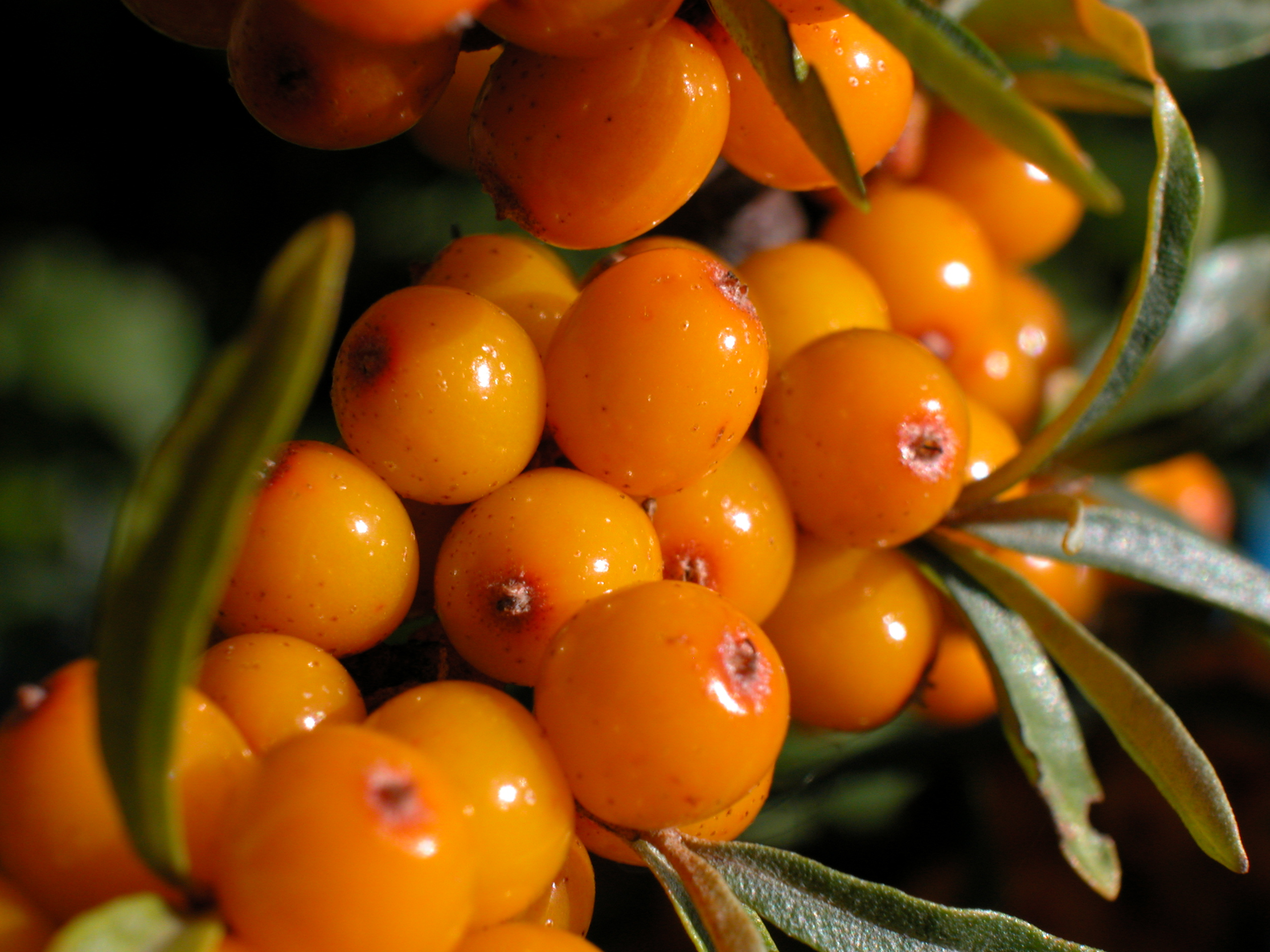
Common sea buckthorn

=== Products ===
Sea buckthorn berries are edible and nutritious, though astringent, sour, and oily unless bletted (frosted to reduce the astringency) and/or mixed as a drink with sweeter substances such as apple or grape juice. Additionally, malolactic fermentation of sea buckthorn juice reduces sourness, enhancing its sensory properties. The mechanism behind this change is transformation of malic acid into lactic acid in microbial metabolism.

When the berries are pressed, the resulting sea buckthorn juice separates into three layers: on top is a thick, orange cream; in the middle, a layer containing sea buckthorn's characteristic high content of saturated and polyunsaturated fats; and the bottom layer is sediment and juice. The upper two layers contain fat sources applicable for cosmetic purposes and can be processed for skin creams and liniments, whereas the bottom layer can be used for edible products such as syrup.

Besides juice, sea buckthorn fruit can be used to make pies, jams, lotions, teas, fruit wines, and liquors. The juice or pulp has other potential applications in foods, beverages or cosmetics products such as shower gel. Fruit drinks were among the earliest sea buckthorn products developed in China. Sea buckthorn-based juice is common in Germany and Scandinavian countries. It provides a beverage rich in vitamin C and carotenoids. Sea buckthorn berries are also used to produce rich orange-coloured ice-cream, with a melon-type taste and hints of citrus.

For its troops confronting low winter temperatures (see Siachen), India's Defence Research and Development Organisation established a factory in Leh to manufacture a multivitamin herbal beverage based on sea buckthorn juice.

The seed and pulp oils have nutritional properties that vary under different processing methods. Sea buckthorn oils are used as a source for ingredients in several commercially available cosmetic products and nutritional supplements.

=== Landscape uses ===
Sea buckthorn may be used as a landscaping shrub with an aggressive basal shoot system used for barrier hedges and windbreaks, and to stabilize riverbanks and steep slopes. They have value in northern climates for their landscape qualities, as the colorful berry clusters are retained through winter. Branches may be used by florists for designing ornaments.

In northwestern China, sea buckthorn shrubs have been planted on the bottoms of dry riverbeds to increase water retention of the soil, thus decreasing sediment loss. Due to increased moisture conservation of the soil and nitrogen-fixing capabilities of sea buckthorn, vegetation levels have increased in areas where sea buckthorn have been planted. Sea buckthorn was once distributed free of charge to Canadian prairie farmers by PFRA to be used in shelterbelts.

== Folk medicine and research ==
Sea buckthorn has been used over centuries in traditional medicine. Although sea buckthorn fruit extracts are under preliminary research for their pharmacological effects, there is no high-quality clinical evidence for the ability of Hippophae products to lower the risk of human diseases. As of 2022, no sea buckthorn products are approved as prescription drugs by any national regulatory agency.

Berry oil from seeds or fruit pulp, either taken orally as a dietary supplement or applied topically, is believed to be a skin softener or medicine, but there is inadequate clinical evidence of its effectiveness. There have been no systematic studies of toxicity and safety for any Hippophae product.

== Organizations ==
The International Seabuckthorn Association, formerly the International Center for Research and Training on Seabuckthorn (ICRTS), was formed jointly in 1988 by the China Research and Training Center on Seabuckthorn, the Seabuckthorn Office of the Yellow River Water Commission, and the Shaanxi Seabuckthorn Development Office. From 1995 to 2000, ICRTS published the research journal, Hippophae, which appears to be no longer active.

In 2005–2007, the "EAN-Seabuck" network between European Union states, China, Russia and New Independent States was funded by the European Commission to promote sustainable crop and consumer product development.

In Mongolia, there is an active National Association of Seabuckthorn Cultivators and Producers.

== See also ==
- Sea buckthorn oil
- Wolfberry, a native Asian plant occasionally mistaken for sea buckthorn
