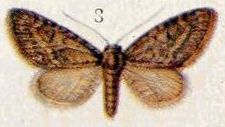

Scientific classification
- Kingdom: Animalia
- Phylum: Arthropoda
- Clade: Pancrustacea
- Class: Insecta
- Order: Lepidoptera
- Family: Geometridae
- Genus: Eupithecia
- Species: E. innotata
- Forma: E. i. f. fraxinata

Trionomial name
- Eupithecia innotata f. fraxinata Crewe, 1863

Synonyms
- Eupithecia fraxinata Crewe, 1863

= Ash pug =

Eupithecia innotata f. fraxinata

Form of moth

The ash pug (Eupithecia innotata f. fraxinata, originally known by the binomial name Eupithecia fraxinata, but now believed to be a form of Eupithecia innotata) is a moth of the family Geometridae. It is widely distributed in the UK.

== Description ==
The forewings are generally dark brown or grey with few distinguishing marks apart from a small white tornal spot which may not be present on the frequent melanic forms. The wingspan is 18–24 mm.

== Biology ==
In Britain, two broods are produced each year, with the adults flying in May and June and again in August. Moths of the spring brood are usually darker in colour than the later specimens.

The caterpillars feed on ash. The species overwinters as a pupa.
