= John and Yoko: A Love Story =

1985 American television biopic

- 2024 DVD cover
- Genre: Biography
- Screenplay by: Sandor Stern
- Story by: Sandor Stern; Edward Hume
- Directed by: Sandor Stern
- Starring: Mark McGann; Kim Miyori; Kenneth Price; Peter Capaldi
- Country of origin: United States
- Original language: English

Production
- Executive producer: John J. McMahon
- Producer: Aida Young
- Cinematography: Alan Hume
- Editor: Ralph Sheldon
- Running time: 146 minutes
- Production company: Carson Productions

Original release
- Network: NBC
- Release: December 2, 1985

John and Yoko: A Love Story is a 1985 American made-for-television biographical film that chronicles the lives of John Lennon and Yoko Ono, beginning just before they met in 1966 and concluding with Lennon's murder in 1980. The movie was made with the co-operation of Ono, who controlled the song rights. It was directed by Sandor Stern and stars Mark McGann as Lennon and Kim Miyori as Ono.

== Plot ==
On August 19, 1966, protestors burn their Beatles records and paraphernalia after John Lennon says The Beatles are more popular than Jesus. When a firecracker is thrown onto the stage the group decides to stop touring.

John meets Yoko Ono, who is married and has a daughter. John brings her to the studio with him, causing friction with the other Beatles. The Beatles manager, Brian Epstein, dies of an accidental overdose of sleeping pills. John develops a crush on Yoko.

In 1968, The Beatles and their partners travel to India for transcendental meditation with the Maharishi Mahesh Yogi. On his return, John invites Yoko to his house while their partners are both away. They record songs together and consummate their relationship at dawn.

John and Yoko stage art exhibitions and plant acorns for peace. John is arrested for possession of hashish, and Paul McCartney bails him out. Yoko miscarries John's baby. John, Yoko, Kyoko, and Julian are hurt in a car accident. Paul marries Linda Eastman, and John marries Yoko in Gibraltar. He starts playing with Yoko's Plastic Ono Band.

John and Yoko stage "Bed-Ins for Peace" in Amsterdam and Montreal, which receive wide attention. Paul signs with his father in-law Lee Eastman as manager; John, George, and Ringo sign with Allen Klein. Yoko again miscarries. In 1970, The Beatles disband and Yoko is widely blamed by the public.

A year later, Yoko's ex-husband Tony Cox refuses to let Yoko see their daughter Kyoko, in breach of the granting of joint custody. Yoko takes Kyoko during a trip to Mallorca, Spain, and is charged with kidnapping.

In 1971, John and Yoko emigrate to New York, where he records his hit solo album Imagine. They are threatened with deportation, spied on, and their house is bugged. Tony is jailed for denying access to Kyoko. Yoko obtains full custody of Kyoko but does not know where she is.

Upset at Richard Nixon's 1972 re-election, John gets drunk and has sex with another woman, prompting Yoko to say she still loves him but that they need time apart. He goes to Los Angeles and begins an affair with music producer May Pang. He and Harry Nilsson are thrown out of the Troubadour nightclub for drunkenly heckling The Smothers Brothers.

In 1974, Nixon resigns and Elton John collaborates on Lennon's song "Whatever Gets You Through the Night" for his new album Walls and Bridges, and makes a deal for a concert appearance if the song hits #1. When it does, Lennon joins Elton's Madison Square Garden concert in November, and sings "Whatever Gets You Through the Night" with him. Afterwards, John encounters Yoko backstage and Elton reveals he had known she was in the audience. John and Yoko reunite, and on October 9, 1975, John's 35th birthday, Yoko gives birth by Caesarean section to their son Sean. John learns that the deportation order against him has been overturned.

John decides to retire to raise Sean for the first five years of his life, becoming a house spouse while Yoko runs a business. Three years later, Julian visits John and has a jamming session with him and three-year-old Sean. Kyoko wants to visit for Christmas but is unable to, leaving Yoko sad.

In 1980, John is amazed by new-wave music and starts writing songs again for a new album. John and Yoko record first Double Fantasy, and then Milk and Honey.

On December 8, after a recording session, John suggests they go on tour when the album is released. Yoko asks that they go and eat, but John wants to go home and see Sean. After arriving, John hears his name called, and turns to see a man pointing a gun at him, about to shoot.

Onscreen text says, "John Lennon died on December 8, 1980". The picture during the credits shows John Lennon and Yoko Ono while the credits show the cast.

== Main cast ==
Actor	Role
Mark McGann	John Lennon
Kim Miyori	Yoko Ono
Kenneth Price	Paul McCartney
Peter Capaldi	George Harrison
Phillip Walsh	Ringo Starr
Richard Morant	Brian Epstein
Rachel Laurence	Cynthia Lennon
Vincent Marzello	Anthony Cox
John Sinclair	George Martin
Matthew Marsh	Elton John
Catherine Strauss	Linda Eastman
Val McLane	Aunt Mimi
Mike Myers	Delivery Boy

== Production ==
The production of the movie required various song rights only available from Yoko Ono, thereby granting her some control over the content. John J. McMahon was executive producer, and Sandor Stern wrote and directed. Stern was chosen after a script by Edward Hume was rejected by Ono after it depicted too much drug abuse.

Mark Lindsay was originally considered for the role of John Lennon. Yoko Ono had been deeply involved in the production and had herself been initially impressed with his audition and approved his casting prior to discovering his full name was Mark Lindsay Chapman. She then nixed his casting on the grounds it was "bad karma" as his name was similar to Mark David Chapman. Lindsay was quietly paid off and the role went to Mark McGann. Eventually, Lindsay did portray Lennon, in the film Chapter 27 (2007), which ironically had Mark David Chapman as the lead character.

Mike Myers has an early uncredited appearance in the film as a young deliveryman.

== Reviews ==
John J. O'Connor's review in The New York Times praised the acting of McGann and Miyori in the title roles. However, he found the movie to be often "ploddingly dull" and the songs the "best part of the show."
