= Jarrett Schaefer =

American film director and screenwriter (born 1979)

- Born: 1979
- Occupation: Film director

Jarrett Schaefer (born 1979) is an American film director and screenwriter. His feature debut, Chapter 27 (2007), premiered and received substantial media and critical attention at the 2007 Sundance Film Festival.

== Biography ==
Born on a U.S. Air Force base in Germany but raised in the United States, Schaefer studied film writing at University of Southern California, in Los Angeles, California. After graduating, he worked as an editor at Fade In magazine and as a videostore clerk while writing scripts and poetry in his spare time.

Schaefer made his feature-length debut in 2007 with Chapter 27, a biographical film depicting the murder of John Lennon by Mark David Chapman. It takes place in December 1980, and is intended to be an exploration of Chapman's psyche. The script took Schaefer four years to write, but when it was finished, the film came together quickly. With the help of producers Alexandra Milchan and Robert Salerno, Schaefer cast Jared Leto as Mark David Chapman.

Chapter 27 premiered at the 2007 Sundance Film Festival where it received polarized reactions from critics. It later went into limited theatrical release in the United States on March 28, 2008. Chapter 27 was cited as one of the most controversial films of 2007. The film received substantial accolades from critics who praised the depiction of the mental state of Mark David Chapman in the days leading up the murder of John Lennon in December 1980. It won the Debut Feature Prize for Schaefer at the Zurich Film Festival.
