= Chapter 27 =

2007 film

- Theatrical release poster
- Directed by: Jarrett Schaefer
- Written by: Jarrett Schaefer
- Based on: Let Me Take You Down by Jack Jones
- Produced by: Robert Salerno; Naomi Despres; Alexandra Milchan
- Starring: Jared Leto; Judah Friedlander; Mark Lindsay Chapman; Lindsay Lohan
- Cinematography: Tom Richmond
- Edited by: Jim Makiej; Andrew Hafitz
- Music by: Anthony Marinelli
- Production company: Artina Films
- Distributed by: Peace Arch Entertainment
- Release dates: January 25, 2007 (Sundance); March 28, 2008 (United States)
- Running time: 84 minutes
- Countries: Canada; United States
- Language: English
- Box office: $187,488

Chapter 27 is a 2007 biographical film written and directed by Jarrett Schaefer and depicting the murder of John Lennon by Mark David Chapman in December 1980. The film is Schaefer' directorial debut, and serves as an exploration of Chapman's psyche. It is based on the 1992 nonfictionbook Let Me Take You Down: Inside the Mind of Mark David Chapman, the Man Who Killed John Lennon by Jack Jones. Jared Leto as Chapman, with Judah Friedlander and Lindsay Lohan in supporting roles. Its title is a reference to J. D. Salinger's 1951 novel The Catcher in the Rye, which Chapman was preoccupied with and has 26 chapters, and suggests a continuation of the book.

As an independent production, it was picked up for distribution by Peace Arch Entertainment and premiered at the 2007 Sundance Film Festival where it received polarized reactions from critics. It later went into limited theatrical release in the United States on March 28, 2008. Chapter 27 was cited as one of the most controversial films of 2007. It received the Debut Feature Prize for Schaefer at the Zurich Film Festival, where Leto also won Best Performance for his portrayal of Chapman.

== Plot ==
On December 8, 1980, Mark David Chapman shocked the world by murdering 40-year-old musician, former member of the Beatles, and activist John Lennon outside The Dakota, his New York apartment building. Chapman's motives were fabricated from pure delusion, fueled by an obsession with the fictional character Holden Caulfield and his similar misadventures in J. D. Salinger's The Catcher in the Rye. In one instant, an anonymous, socially awkward and mentally unstable 25-year-old fan of the Beatles, who had fluctuated between idealizing Lennon and being overcome with a desire to kill him, altered the course of the history of music.

A man whose painfully restless mind thrashes about uncontrollably between paranoia, sociopathic lying and delusion is summed up in such character revealing comments as "I'm too vulnerable for a world full of pain and lies" and "Everyone is cracked and broken. You have to find something to fix you. To give you what you need. To make you whole again." From his lies to cab drivers (identifying himself as the Beatles' sound engineer) to his socially unacceptable behavior around Jude, a young fan he meets outside The Dakota, to his argument with paparazzi photographer Paul, Chapman keeps the psychoses bubbling below the surface as his grasp on reality deteriorates into a completely misguided rage.

== Cast ==
- Jared Leto as Mark David Chapman
- Judah Friedlander as Paul Goresh
- Lindsay Lohan as Jude Hanson
- Mark Lindsay Chapman as John Lennon

== Production ==
=== Development ===
The real Mark David Chapman is currently incarcerated at Wende Correctional Facility, on a guilty plea. Aside from two interviews with Larry King and Barbara Walters, both in 1992, he has not spoken with the media. However, Chapman did reveal the mechanics of his unraveling during those three days in New York City to journalist Jack Jones. The interviews were published in 1992 as Let Me Take You Down: Inside the Mind of Mark David Chapman, a book of Chapman's recollections of his act of violence. Chapter 27 is based on this text. The title "Chapter 27" suggests a continuation of J. D. Salinger's novel The Catcher in the Rye, which has twenty-six chapters, and which Chapman was carrying when he shot John Lennon. Chapman was obsessed with the book, to the point of attempting to model his life after its protagonist, Holden Caulfield.

According to the British music magazine Mojo, the title was also inspired by a chapter of Robert Rosen's book Nowhere Man: The Final Days of John Lennon (2000) called "Chapter 27." Rosen's book explores the numerological meaning of the number 27, "the triple 9", a number of profound importance to John Lennon. Lennon was deeply interested in numerology, particularly Cheiro's Book of Numbers, along with nine and all its multiples. It was Chapman's goal, according to Rosen, to write Chapter 27 "in Lennon's blood". Rosen wrote on his blog, in late 2006, that "the inherent truth of my contention that the film’s title was inspired by Nowhere Man remains unchallenged—because it’s self-evident to anybody who’s read the book."

Like Chapman, Schaefer is a fan of both the Beatles and The Catcher in the Rye, and said he began the script to try to understand "how someone could be inspired to kill anyone as a result of being exposed to this kind of beautiful art. It really bothered me, because Lennon and Salinger have always made me feel so much better, and so much less alone."

=== Casting ===
The script took Schaefer four years to write, but when it was finished, the film came together quickly. With the help of producers Alexandra Milchan and Robert Salerno, Schaefer cast Jared Leto as Chapman. For his role, Leto gained 67 pounds (30 kg) by drinking microwaved pints of ice cream mixed with soy sauce and olive oil every night. Gaining the weight, he said, was tougher than dieting himself into skeletal shape for his role as drug addict Harry Goldfarb in Requiem for a Dream (2000). The abruptness of Leto's weight gain gave him gout. He had to use a wheelchair due to the stress of the sudden increase in weight put on his body. After the shooting of the film, Leto quickly went on a liquid diet. He explained, "I've been fasting ever since. I've been doing this very strange, like, lemon and cayenne pepper and water fast. I didn't eat any food for 10 days straight; I think I lost 20 pounds that first 10 days." Losing the excess weight after Chapter 27 proved a challenge. "It took about a year to get back to a place that felt semi-normal," he said; "I don't know if I'll ever be back to the place I was physically. I'd never do it again; it definitely gave me some problems."

Twenty-two years prior to this film's production, actor Mark Lindsay Chapman, while professionally using the name Mark Lindsay, had been almost cast as Lennon in the biopic John and Yoko: A Love Story (1985). Yoko Ono had been deeply involved in the production and had herself been initially impressed with his audition and approved his casting prior to discovering his full name was coincidentally Mark Lindsay Chapman. She then nixed his casting on the grounds it was "bad karma", and a great deal of press attention was given to his having almost gotten the role. Schaefer auditioned many Lennon impersonators, but was especially impressed with Mark Lindsay Chapman's tape because he conveyed the "tough town" street-smart quality of Lennon that the impersonators failed to convey, as they always played Lennon as larger-than-life. Schaefer described Lennon as having a "chip on his shoulder and always cracking these cynical one-liners", and felt that actor Chapman was best at conveying this quality. Schaefer had some difficulty negotiating the casting with the film's producers because of Chapman's name. After Chapman was cast, he asked Chapman how he should be billed to which Chapman replied "Mark fucking Lindsay Chapman. That's my fucking name." Schaefer remarks that this was so reflective of how Lennon talked, it just reinforced his sense that Chapman was right for the part.

=== Filming ===
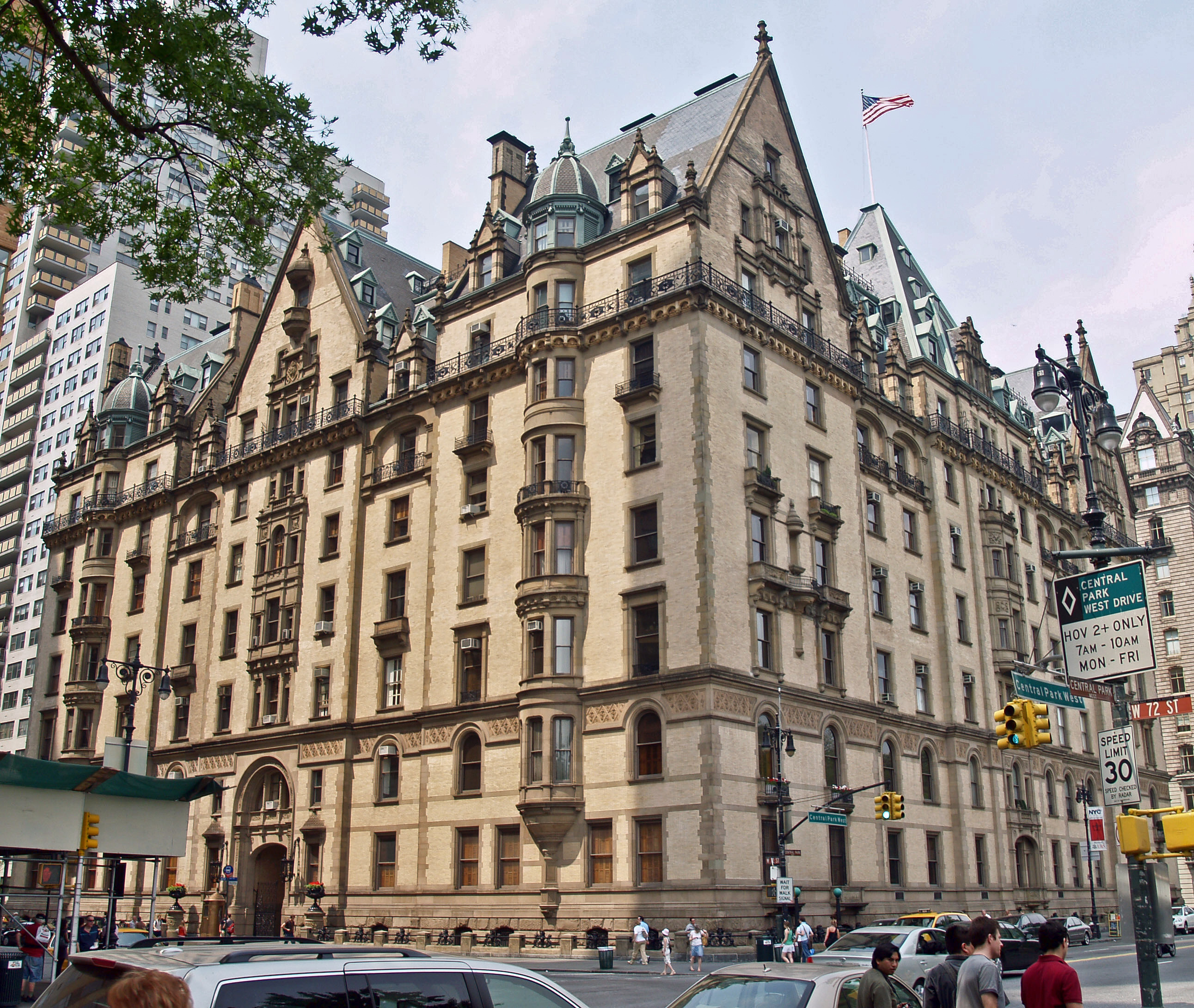
The Dakota, location of the killing of John Lennon

The film began shooting in Manhattan, New York in 2006. "I don't have much to compare it to, but the challenges were daunting," said Schaefer, who directed several sequences outside The Dakota, the site of Lennon's murder, "I had to go into a place that was very sensitive to our story, with trucks, a crew, and a limited amount of time. It wasn't easy."

"It was important to Jarrett that we didn't glorify this event," said Salerno. "He didn't want to shoot any of the scenes with John Lennon at The Dakota out of respect for the residents that were there at the time John was killed, so all of that footage was shot separately at another location that we were able keep closed and controlled." These scenes were shot at the Steiner Studios in Brooklyn.

== Release ==
The studio held Chapter 27's world premiere at the Sundance Film Festival in January 2007. The film was subsequently screened at the Berlin International Film Festival, Athens Film Festival, Festroia International Film Festival, Waterfront Film Festival, Mediterranean Film Festival, Stockholm International Film Festival, Oslo International Film Festival and the Denver Film Festival.

The Motion Picture Association of America (MPAA) gave the film a Restricted rating for language and some sexual content. Chapter 27 had a limited release in the United States on March 28, 2008 and earned $13,910 in a single theater over the opening weekend. The film's revenues increased by 11.4% in its second weekend in domestic markets, earning $15,500 in five theaters. Chapter 27 grossed $56,215 in the United States and $131,273 overseas. In total, the film has grossed $187,488 worldwide. Its international releases include Mexico ($107,443), Portugal ($20,433), and France ($3,397).

Chapter 27 was released on DVD on April 28, 2008 in the United Kingdom. In the United States, it was released on the same formats on July 1, 2008 in exclusives, and everywhere September 30, 2008. The British edition contains a making-of and the trailer of the film, while the American edition includes only a behind-the-scenes.

== Critical reception ==
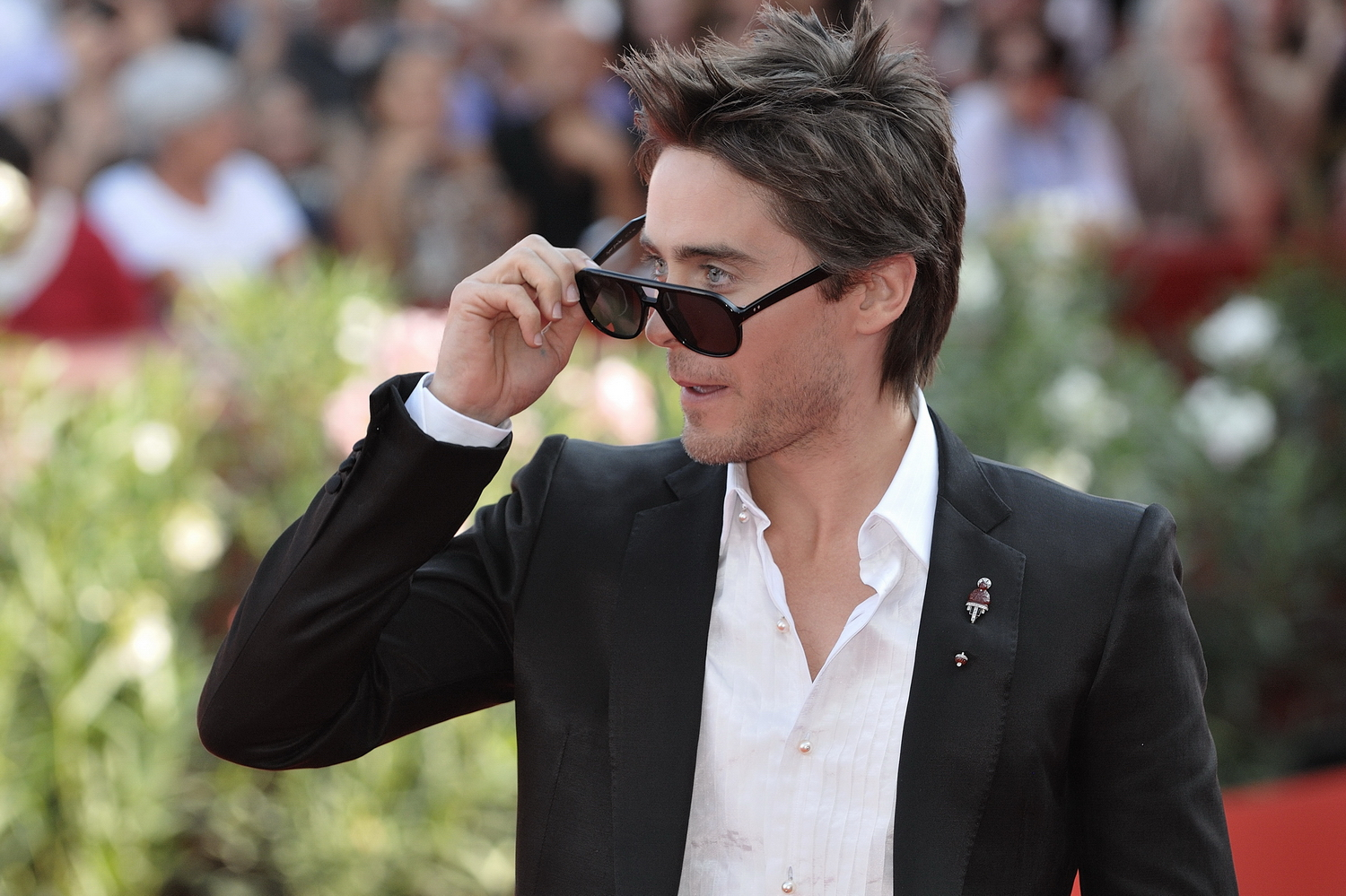
Jared Leto's performance as Mark David Chapman was praised by critics.

When Chapter 27 premiered at the Sundance Film Festival, the film was debated fiercely by critics. MTV wrote that "the audience's reactions made it obvious that some people would love it and others would not." On review aggregator Rotten Tomatoes, the film holds an approval rating of 18% based on 50 reviews, with an average rating of 4.0/10. The website's critical consensus reads: "Despite Jared Leto's committed performance, Chapter 27 fails to penetrate the mind of Mark David Chapman, John Lennon's killer." On Metacritic, the film has a weighted average score of 32 out of 100, based on 19 critics, indicating "generally unfavorable" reviews.

Andrew O'Hehir from Salon wrote, "Some viewers may well find Chapter 27 sleazy or distasteful, and I won't argue the point. But Schaefer's movie creates its own highly compelling world, which is pretty much the prime directive in filmmaking." He stated that "Leto almost makes you feel how it happened," and called his acting a "highly compelling performance on many levels." He also enjoyed Lohan's performance. Duane Byrge of The Hollywood Reporter wrote, "Chapter 27 is a smart attempt to distill the twisted psychology and motivation of Mark David Chapman, which we've all superficially gleaned through mass-media reports and intermittent updates on Chapman's incarceration." He praised Leto's acting saying, "Jared Leto is mesmeric as the bloated, deranged Chapman. It's a brilliantly measured performance, evincing the tale of a madman through his own awful rhyme and reason." He also praised Schaefer's direction, the other cast and crew. Michael Phillips of the Chicago Tribune gave the film three out of four stars saying, "By the end of this modest, strange venture, Leto made me believe it was worth being forced to hang out on the sidewalk with this man, if only to get a creeping sense of what that might've been like."

Upon the film's theatrical release, Richard Roeper wrote, "This is a very tough film to watch, especially for Beatles fans that worshipped Lennon, but it does provide a thought-provoking take on the inner workings of Mark David Chapman's twisted mind." San Francisco Chronicle's Joel Selvin praised Schaefer's direction writing, "The film is impressively mounted and Schaefer has made a directorial debut of distinction, but it is an uncomfortable ride from the opening scenes of Chapman arriving in New York to the inevitable, inexorable final scene." He also called Leto's performance utterly convincing. Rex Reed gave the film a positive review writing, "Even if you are only moderately curious about the events that led up to the pointless death of a musical icon, I think you'll find it a film of arm-twisting fascination." He praised Leto calling him unforgettable and writing, "it is the pulverizing concentration and almost somnambulistic intensity of Jared Leto that gives the film its life and pulse." Owen Gleiberman of Entertainment Weekly gave the film a B saying, "Chapter 27 is far from flawless, but Leto disappears inside this angry, mouth-breathing psycho geek with a conviction that had me hanging on his every delusion." Joe Neumaier of the New York Daily News described Chapter 27 as "a claustrophobic drama that gets uncomfortably into the head of Mark David Chapman," and praised Leto saying, "Leto's drawling, blotchy, creepy performance sets it apart."

== Accolades ==
Award	Category	Recipient	Result
National Film Critics Circle	Best Actor in a Leading Role	Jared Leto	Nominated
National Film Critics Circle	Best Original Score	Anthony Marinelli	Nominated
Zurich Film Festival	Debut Feature Prize	Jarrett Schaefer	Won
Zurich Film Festival	Best Performance	Jared Leto	Won

== Cultural impact ==
What is the name of the person who killed John Lennon? Paul McCartney and Yoko Ono made a simple request to John Lennon's fans. Never repeat the name of his killer. Doing so would only give his killer the fame and notoriety he was seeking.

— Statement on the petition website Boycottchapter27.org.

Chapter 27 was one of the most controversial films of the 2000s. In April 2006, an on-line petition group calling themselves Boycottchapter27.org campaigned to "pressurise movie theatres not to show the film, to stop the glorification of a murderer." Lennon's widow, Yoko Ono, expressed her thought, saying, "This is another thing which will hurt me, I'm sure. I would rather not make a story out of Mr. Chapman at all, although I sympathize with the actors. They need to work. It's not just films, you're always talking about it [Lennon's murder]."

Sean Lennon, Lennon's son, has gone on record calling the production and making of the film, including Lindsay Lohan's involvement with it, "tacky." Lennon also stated that Lohan understood his feelings and, despite his criticism, they were friends and he did not want to hurt her feelings.

The film received accolades from critics who praised the depiction of the mental state of Mark David Chapman in the days leading up the murder of John Lennon in December 1980.

== See also ==
- The Killing of John Lennon, a similar film that premiered in 2006.
