= Dennis Edwards Jr. =

American judge (1921–2017)

New York Supreme Court (acting justice)
- In office 1980–1982
- Nominated by: Robert F. Wagner

New York Court of Claims
- In office 1983–1989
- Nominated by: Mario M. Cuomo

Personal details
- Born: August 19, 1921 Harlem, New York
- Died: April 13, 2017 (aged 95) New York City, New York
- Party: Democratic
- Spouse: Dorothy Fairclough Edwards
- Children: Lynne Edwards Engelskirchen; Denise Edwards Young
- Education: New York University; Harvard Law School
- Occupation: Judge
- Profession: Lawyer

Dennis Edwards Jr. (August 19, 1921 – April 13, 2017) was a judge in New York City.

== Early life ==
Edwards was born in Harlem, in New York City. His parents were Dennis Edwards Sr. and Gladys Edwards (née Wilson). He graduated from DeWitt Clinton High School in the Bronx in 1937 and then from New York University in 1941. While attending N.Y.U., he became a member of his local Democratic Party organization to prepare himself for a political science course, and it was there that the other members urged him to study law.

== Legal career ==
Edwards graduated from Harvard Law School in 1944, and then took a job in the legal department of the Service Transportation Corporation. In 1948, he became law secretary to the New York State Supreme Court, where he served under Justices Benjamin F. Schreiber and Henry Clay Greenberg.

In 1965, New York City Mayor Robert F. Wagner appointed Edwards to be a judge on the New York City Criminal Court. Among the notable cases he heard was that of restaurateur Toots Shor, who was accused of assaulting an unruly customer in 1967. Edwards was subsequently reappointed to his court seat by John V. Lindsay in 1972 and by Edward I. Koch in 1981.

In 1980, Edwards was named an acting justice of New York Supreme Court, and several months later, presided over his best-known case, that of Mark David Chapman, who killed John Lennon. The charge was second-degree murder, which carried a maximum sentence of 25 years to life. After several hearings regarding his competency and against the advice of his lawyer, Chapman pleaded guilty on June 22, 1981. In accepting the plea, Judge Edwards informed Chapman that he would hand down a sentence of only 20 years to life because he had entered his guilty plea voluntarily due to Chapman believing it was the Will of God instructed him to plead guilty. In a very unusual move, Edwards closed the proceedings to the public and press without prior notice or holding a hearing. According to the court transcript, that Edwards expressed concern that if he did not accept the plea, his decision might later prejudice a jury at trial as the result of having to ask Chapman specific questions about the crime. At the formal sentencing on August 24, Judge Edwards also recommended that Chapman receive psychiatric treatment during his imprisonment. Chapman's lawyer appealed the guilty plea and sentence on the grounds that Chapman was mentally incompetent when he made his plea, but in 1984, the Appellate Division court upheld Edwards’ decision.

New York Governor Mario M. Cuomo nominated Edwards to the New York Court of Claims in 1983, where he served until his retirement in 1989.

== Personal life ==
Edward married Dorothy Fairclough, who died in 2016. He was survived by his two daughters Lynne Edwards Engelskirchen and Denise Edwards Young, three grandchildren, and two great-grandchildren.
