= Mark Lindsay Chapman =

English actor (b. 1954)

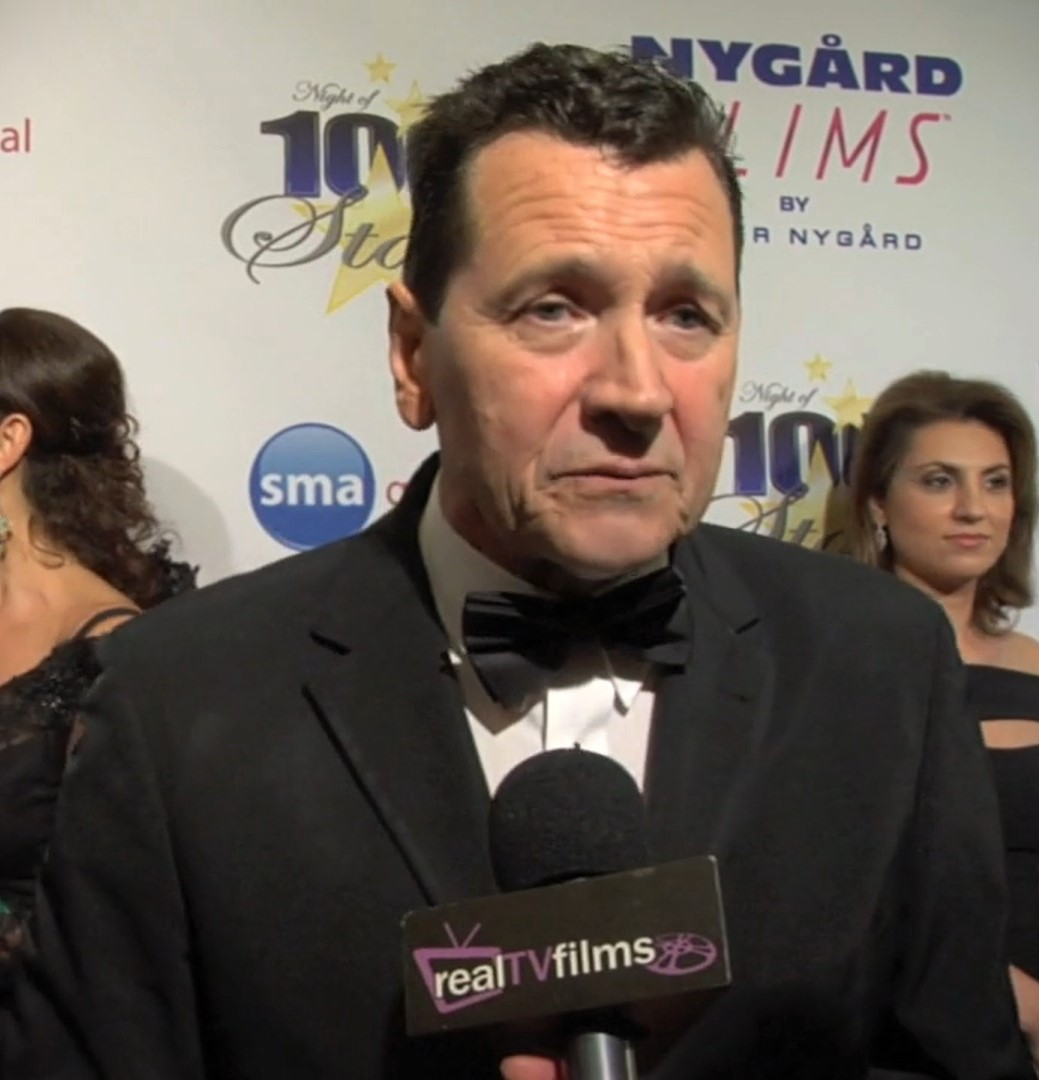
- Chapman interviewed by RealTVfilms in 2015
- Born: 8 September 1954 (age 72); London, England
- Education: Guildford School of Acting
- Occupation: Actor
- Spouse: Cheree Vandoren (divorced)
- Children: 2

Markus Lindsay Chapman (born 8 September 1954) is an English actor. He is known for his roles as Chief Officer Henry Wilde in the film Titanic (1997), as John Lennon in the film Chapter 27 (2007) and as Dr. Anton Arcane on the USA Network TV series Swamp Thing from 1990 to 1993.

== Career ==
He attended the Guildford School of Acting where he studied ballet, speech, drama, and fencing.

His television credits include: Max Headroom, Dallas (as Brett Lomax), Falcon Crest, Baywatch, Murder, She Wrote, Lois and Clark: The New Adventures of Superman, JAG, Charmed, The Young and the Restless, Swamp Thing, and The Langoliers. He played Chief Officer Henry Tingle Wilde in the 1997 film Titanic. A Paramount internal memo dated from 1987 has revealed that Chapman was once considered for the part of Data in Star Trek: The Next Generation.

The similarity between his name and that of John Lennon's murderer, Mark David Chapman, prevented him in 1985 from playing Lennon in John and Yoko: A Love Story, a biographical film produced by NBC; Yoko Ono had been deeply involved in the production and had herself been initially impressed with his audition and approved his casting prior to discovering his full name was Mark Lindsay Chapman. She then nixed his casting on the grounds it was "bad karma", and a great deal of press attention was given to his having almost got the role (Chapman changed his name to Lindsay when he joined Equity, as there was already a Mark Chapman in the union). The role went instead to Mark McGann. Chapman's full name surfaced again when the story was published in Britain, and reporters began making inquiries about the actor, who was then working as a bricklayer with his father.

Eventually Lindsay did portray Lennon, in the 2007 film Chapter 27, which had Mark David Chapman as the lead character.

== Personal life ==
Chapman was arrested in March 2018 for allegedly assaulting his then-girlfriend, Tara Pirnia, after she ended their five-year relationship. She filed a restraining order afterward.

== Filmography ==
=== Film ===
Year	Title	Role	Notes
1995	Separate Lives	Keno Sykes	
1997	Titanic	Henry Tingle Wilde	
1998	Legend of the Mummy	Daw	
2001	Beethoven's 4th	Johnnie Simmons	
2007	Chapter 27	John Lennon	
2012	Steve Jobs: iGenius	Narrator	
2013	Abner, the Invisible Dog	Abner	Voice
2014	Christmas in Palm Springs	Rees	
2015	Futbol	Announcer	

=== Television ===
Year	Title	Role	Notes
1983	The Third Part of King Henry VI	Second Company	Television film
1983	Macbeth	Murderer	Television film
1986	Assassin	Hotel Clerk	Television film
1986	Annihilator	Robert Armour	TV Movie
1987	Max Headroom	Paddy Ashton	Episode: "Dream Thieves"
1987	Throb	Chauffeur	Episode: "Last Night at the Fire Station: Part 1"
1987–1995	Murder, She Wrote	Various roles	5 episodes
1987–2004	Days of Our Lives	Agent Spector / Trevor Lodge	24 episodes
1988	Dallas	Brett Lomax	5 episodes
1989	Nightingales	Josh	2 episodes
1989	CBS Summer Playhouse	Jack Marlowe	Episode: "Shivers"
1989	Falcon Crest	Charley St. James	8 episodes
1990	Night Visions	Man	Television film
1990–1993	Swamp Thing	Anton Arcane	72 episodes
1993	Baywatch	The Great Maroni	Episode: "Tower of Power"
1994	The Untouchables	Stadt	Episode: "Stadt"
1994	Valley of the Dolls	Nick	Episode #1.10
1994	Renegade	Michael Covington	Episode: "Teen Angel"
1995	The Langoliers	Nick Hopewell	2 episodes
1995–1996	Silk Stalkings	Nigel Buckley / Steven Bolton	2 episodes
1996	Weird Science	Willem	Episode: "Gary & Wyatt's Bloodsucking Adventure"
1996	Lois & Clark: The New Adventures of Superman	Jen Mai	2 episodes
1996	The Burning Zone	Henry Lefort	Episode: "Blood Covenant"
1997	JAG	Vincent Hutchinson	Episode: "Trinity"
1998	Night Man	Andre Barzun	Episode: "Book of the Dead"
1998	Air America	Harry Faversham	Episode: "Seller's Market"
1999	Poltergeist: The Legacy	Dr. Mordecai Church	2 episodes
1999	Silk Hope	Ted Bass	Television film
1999–2000	Nash Bridges	Brennan / Andrew Storey Mark	2 episodes
2000	Charmed	Finley Beck	Episode: "Chick Flick"
2000	Walker, Texas Ranger	Frank	Episode: "Showdown at Casa Diablo: Part 2"
2002	Trapped: Buried Alive	Reno Riley	Television film
2006	The Young and the Restless	Mystery Man / Roland Burke	3 episodes
2011	Supah Ninjas	Sir Nigel Wicket	Episode: "Kickbutt"
2011	Masters of the House	Robert Delaney	6 episodes
2011	Holly's Holiday	Livingston	Television film
2012	All About Christmas Eve	Gavin Jones	Television film
2015	Kidnapped: The Hannah Anderson Story	Piers Morgan	Television film
2015	Ominous	The Stranger	Television film
2015	A Prince for Christmas	Geoffrey	Television film
2017	The Twin	Dr. Rubin	Television film
