= Howard Bishop =

American actor

Howard Bishop is an actor from Hawaii. He has appeared in films, and on TV on the Fox, CBS and NBC networks.

== Education in drama ==
Bishop received an undergraduate degree in theatre arts from the University of Minnesota Duluth in 1973 and a Master of Fine Arts from Southern Methodist University in 1977. He has been a member of the Screen Actors Guild‐American Federation of Television and Radio Artists SAG-AFTRA since 1978.

== Acting career ==
=== Films ===
His film credits include playing Agent Meyers in You May Not Kiss the Bride (2011), and appearances in the 2014 film of Under the Blood-Red Sun, Parts Of The Same Circle (2012)-playing a homicide detective; Go for Broke (2018); The Killing of John Lennon (2006) - playing Mark David Chapman's father; The Olsen Twins Navy Adventure (1997), and The Bermuda Triangle (film) (1977).

=== Television ===
For the Fox, CBS and NBC networks, he has appeared in the following programs: North Shore (TV series), Raven (U.S. TV series), Island Son, Beasts Are In The Streets and in a 1990 episode (Exactly Like You) of the TV series Jake and the Fatman.

=== Other ===
Howard Bishop has also appeared in theatre in Honolulu, taking part in stage productions of The Full Monty and Hairspray. He has been engaged for numerous educational, training, industrial, commercial and voice-over roles, including a commercial for McDonald's in which he plays a car salesman - a role he also has in real life; since 1995 Bishop has also been employed selling Mercedes-Benz cars in Honolulu.
