= The Killing of John Lennon =

- Theatrical release poster
- Directed by: Andrew Piddington
- Written by: Andrew Piddington
- Produced by: Rakha Singh
- Starring: Jonas Ball; Robert C. Kirk; Thomas A. McMahon; Mie Omori; Krisha Fairchild
- Cinematography: Roger Eaton
- Edited by: Tony Palmer
- Music by: Martin Kiszko; Makana
- Production company: Picture Players Productions
- Distributed by: Universal Pictures (United Kingdom); IFC Films (United States)
- Release dates: 15 July 2006 (Edinburgh Film Festival); 2 January 2008 (United States)
- Running time: 114 minutes
- Countries: United Kingdom; United States
- Language: English
- Box office: $6,975

The Killing of John Lennon is a 2006 biographical film about Mark David Chapman's plot to kill musician John Lennon. The film was written and directed by Andrew Piddington and stars Jonas Ball, Robert C. Kirk and Thomas A. McMahon.

A British-American co-production, it was not released in the United States until 2008 and received much less attention than the similarly themed American-produced independent film Chapter 27, released the year prior. The film received mixed reviews from critics.

== Premise ==
The film follows Mark David Chapman three months prior to the Lennon assassination and contains flashbacks to Chapman's earlier life and upbringing, while also exploring his infatuation with J.D. Salinger's 1951 novel The Catcher in the Rye and the links between this and his motivation for the killing.

== Cast ==
- Jonas Ball as Mark David Chapman
- Richard Sherman/Tom J. Raider as John Lennon
- Joe Abbate as Taxi Driver
- Gail Kay Bell as Psychiatrist
- J. Francis Curley as Security Guard
- Nicole Delorey as Record Shop Girl
- Sofia Dubrawsky as Jude
- Krisha Fairchild as Diane Pease Chapman, Chapman's Mother
- Howard Bishop as David Chapman, Chapman's Father
- Jane Fox as Prostitute
- James Hadde as Scientologist
- Zero Kazama as Scientologist Leader
- Robert C. Kirk as Detective John Sullivan
- Thomas A. McMahon as Spiro
- Mie Omori as Gloria Chapman
- Joe Rosario as Police Inspector
- John Sierros as Reporter
- Anthony Solis as Gun Salesman
- Tom Zolandz as Goresh
- Yuka Sanabe/Yan Xi as Yoko Ono

John Lennon, George Harrison, Paul McCartney and Ringo Starr appear as themselves in archive footage from the 1960s. Ted Koppel appears as himself, a news anchor from ABC News, on 9 December 1980. President Ronald Reagan also appears as himself in archive footage from the assassination attempt in 1981.

== Reception ==
On review aggregator Rotten Tomatoes, the film holds an approval rating of 37% based on 35 reviews, with an average rating of 4.9/10. The website's critics consensus reads: "Despite a committed performance by newcomer Jonas Ball, The Killing of John Lennon is ultimately a flimsy character study." On Metacritic, the film has a weighted average score of 49 out of 100, based on 10 critics, indicating "mixed or average reviews".

== See also ==
- Murder of John Lennon
