= You May Not Kiss the Bride =

- Theatrical release poster
- Directed by: Rob Hedden
- Screenplay by: Rob Hedden
- Produced by: David A. Jackson; Shauna Shapiro Jackson; Gina Watumull; Rann Watumull
- Starring: Dave Annable; Katharine McPhee; Rob Schneider; Mena Suvari; Tia Carrere; Kathy Bates; Vinnie Jones; Ken Davitian
- Cinematography: Russ T. Alsobrook
- Edited by: David L. Bertman
- Music by: Geoff Zanelli
- Production company: Hawaii Film Partners
- Distributed by: Freestyle Releasing
- Release dates: April 6, 2011 (Sonoma Film Festival); August 30, 2012 (United States)
- Running time: 99 minutes
- Country: United States
- Language: English
- Budget: $6 million

You May Not Kiss the Bride is a 2011 romantic action comedy written and directed by Rob Hedden and starring Dave Annable, Katharine McPhee, Mena Suvari, Kathy Bates, and Rob Schneider.

== Plot ==
Unassuming pet photographer Bryan Lighthouse (Dave Annable) is thrown into a serious action and romance adventure when he is forced to marry Masha Nikitin (Katharine McPhee) to pay a debt to her criminal parents against his will. Masha's father Vlatko (Ken Davitian) marries her to Bryan to get her a green card, under the condition that Bryan cannot touch her. Off to spend their honeymoon at a remote tropical resort somewhere in Tahiti, Masha's former boyfriend Brick (Vinnie Jones), who is in love with her (although she does not return the feeling), follows them.

After Masha catches Bryan dancing with a hotel waitress, she storms off, as it is hinted she hates womanizers. Feeling bad, the waitress Lani (Tia Carrere) suggests Bryan take Masha on a romantic outing, to a secret beach encased by a tropical rainforest to make it up to her. While teasing Bryan at the secret cove, Masha flees into the rainforest and is kidnapped.

Bryan searches for Masha back at the hotel, unaware she has been kidnapped. He then finds that his psychotic assistant, Tonya (Mena Suvari), who is in love with him, has tracked him down to the resort. Tonya has brought condoms and tries to have sex with him. After Bryan informs her that he does not want to have sex with her, Tonya agrees to help find Masha, but tells him that she will one day force him to have sex with her, after trying to have sex with him one more time.

After receiving a call from Masha's kidnappers demanding a ransom, Bryan asks Lani for help. While Bryan, Lani, and Tonya are making plans, Brick storms in and Lani and Tonya escape off the balcony, leaving Bryan to face Brick's wrath. When Brick finds a condom Tonya had brought on the unmade, wrecked bed, he assumes that Bryan had attempted to take Masha's virginity and hits him. Bryan barely escapes, while Brick calls Masha's father back in the USA and informs him of Masha's kidnapping, making it sound as if Bryan had been the kidnapper. Meanwhile, the kidnappers turn out to be two American INS agents Agent Meyers (Howard Bishop) and Agent Ross (Kevin Dunn).

Afterwards Brick tells Masha's father Vlatko about the condom and Bryan's supposed attempt to have sex with Masha, Vlatko becomes enraged and prepares to fly to the island. Lani calls her cousin, Ernesto (Rob Schneider) to help find Masha with his helicopter. A chase scene occurs between Brick and the four heroes (Bryan, Lani, Tonya, and Ernesto) and ends with the group making a hasty escape in Ernesto's helicopter, only to later crash-land by a fishing village. Deciding to rest on a beach at the edge of the village, Ernesto and Tonya kiss passionately, unconcerned of Masha's dire condition, and Lani and Bryan storm off in anger. Alone, Ernesto and Tonya almost have sex in a boat in the grass, but Brick soon shows up and knocks them out, revealing that Brick is in on the kidnapping. Separated, Lani and Bryan obliviously go in separate directions. Masha escapes her surfboard shack prison and finds Bryan, who is crazily driving a jeep stolen from Brick after he tried to kill Bryan. Bryan and Masha crash the jeep, which erupts into flames, and make an escape on foot.

Finding a canoe on a river, they outrun the three culprits and find a friendly welcoming old-time village. After eating a huge dinner and dancing and having fun, Masha and Bryan have sex for the first time. The next morning, they awake to a cheering village. However, during breakfast the two agents and Brick find the village. Brick and the lovers battle on a steep ocean cliff. Just as Brick is ready to kill Bryan, Lani and Ernesto show up in the helicopter, catching Brick off guard. Masha, using the distraction, grabs Brick's gun and shoots him in the back: he falls off the cliff, taking Bryan with him. Masha is in shock, terrified with the thought that she killed Bryan too. Bryan appears in the waves, unharmed, and they are reunited with Masha's family.

Vlatko gives Bryan his blessing to marry Masha for real, but he declines despite his feelings for her.

Masha, heartbroken, continues her old life taking dance lessons. One day, unable to concentrate on the dance routine she was practicing, Masha leaves the dance studio to find Bryan outside ready to propose to her as he changed his mind. As the crowd around them applauds, the film ends with the camera panning away from the couple as they kiss.

== Cast ==
- Dave Annable as Bryan Lighthouse, a pet photographer. He is Masha's husband and Tonya's initial love interest.
- Katharine McPhee as Masha Nikitin, Bryan's love interest and wife. She was kidnapped by Agent Ross, Agent Meyers and Brick.
- Rob Schneider as Ernesto, an insane helicopter pilot. He is Lani's cousin and Tonya's love interest.
- Mena Suvari as Tonya, Bryan's psychotic assistant who tries numerous times to have sex with him. She instead has sex with Ernesto.
- Pavel Priluchny
- Tia Carrere as Lani, a resort waitress who helps Bryan find Masha. Ernesto's cousin.
- Vinnie Jones as Brick, another one of Masha's kidnappers who loves Masha.
- Kathy Bates as Bryan's mother, a freak who encourages Bryan to take Masha's virginity.
- Kevin Dunn as Agent Ross, one of Masha's kidnappers.
- Howard Bishop as Agent Meyers, the third and final of Masha's kidnappers.
- Ken Davitian as Vlatko Nikitin, Masha's criminal father.
- Jeanne Rogers as Borislava Nikitin, Masha's mother.
- Paul Leo Klink as Club Zagrev VIP Paul.

== Production ==
You May Not Kiss the Bride was filmed in Hawaii in early 2009. The production budget was $6 million. Hawaii Film Partners was the production company. Rob Hedden directed from his original screenplay.

== Release ==
The film was set to debut September 2, 2011, in one theater in Hawaii (as the film company Hawaii Film Partners is Hawaii-based) in a very limited US release and then open overseas in Russia, Romania, Hungary, Canada, and Latin America.

On September 2, 2011, Consolidated Theaters announced that the film did not end up debuting in that one Hawaii theater as it was picked up by a yet-to-be-announced distributor and may get a wider US release later in 2011.

Variety reported on November 1 that the SC Group was shopping the film at the American Film Market, with a screening held on November 3 in Santa Monica, California.

The film was finally released theatrically in the US in late 2012, premiering in Hawaii on August 29, 2012, and opened on the mainland in several markets, including Chicago and Los Angeles, as well as Video On Demand, iTunes, and Amazon, on September 21, 2012. Since Hawaii Film Partners had trouble getting the film distributed due to its small budget and its stars not being major movie stars, HFP formed Hawaii Film Partners Distribution and distributed the movie themselves.

The film was set to be released to theaters internationally in 20 countries in the Fall of 2012.

The DVD was released on February 5, 2013, in the United States.

== Music ==
Most of the songs used in the film are by Hawaiian musicians. One of the songs, "Beautiful Stranger", was co-written by star McPhee and producers David and Shauna Jackson. The soundtrack is now available on iTunes.
