= Nowhere Man: The Final Days of John Lennon =

2000 book by Robert Rosen

- Cover of US paperback edition, from Quick American Archives, 2002
- Author: Robert Rosen
- Cover artist: Andrea Ventura
- Language: English
- Genre: Nonfiction
- Publisher: South Village Press, Quick American Archives, Soft Skull Press
- Publication date: July 2000
- Publication place: United States
- Media type: Print (Hardback & Paperback)
- Pages: 298 pp (Paperback)
- ISBN: 979-8218038946
- OCLC: 50925291

Nowhere Man: The Final Days of John Lennon, first published in 2000 and written by New York journalist Robert Rosen, who in 1981 had access to John Lennon's diaries, is a controversial account of the ex-Beatle's last five years. Rosen says in the book's first chapter, "John Lennon's Diaries", that he used his memory of Lennon's diaries as "a roadmap to the truth." The title of the book refers to The Beatles' song "Nowhere Man" (which was written and sung primarily by Lennon).

== Content ==
The book disputes the official view of Lennon as a contented househusband raising his son Sean and baking bread while Yoko ran the family business. Instead, Nowhere Man portrays Lennon's daily life at the Dakota as that of a "tormented superstar, a prisoner of his fame, locked in his bedroom raving about Jesus Christ, while a retinue of servants tended to his every need."

The final part of the book, The Coda, focuses on the mental disintegration of Lennon's assassin, Mark David Chapman, and includes Chapter 27, the so-called missing chapter of J.D. Salinger's novel, The Catcher in the Rye, that "inspired" Chapman to murder Lennon. It was Chapman's goal, according to Rosen, to write Chapter 27 "in Lennon's blood."

== Release and reception ==
Originally written in 1982, the manuscript remained unpublished for 18 years. Soft Skull Press acquired the rights to the book in 1999 and brought out the hardcover edition the following year. Quick American Archives then picked up the rights and published the paperback edition in 2002. The other foreign editions were published by DHC (Japan, 2000), Fusion Press (UK, 2000), Hannibal (Germany, 2001). and Coniglio (Italy 2011). Nowhere Man was a bestseller in the United States (Los Angeles Times, September 3, 2000), England (Mojo, October 2000), and Japan (Amazon.co.jp, October 2000).

In 2003, Random House Mondadori brought out a Spanish-language edition in Latin America. The book received extensive coverage and was excerpted in such publications as Proceso, La Jornada, El Universal, Reforma, Semana, Gatopardo, Soho, El Heraldo, El Mercurio, La Tercera, Las Últimas Noticias, and The Clinic. Nowhere Man appeared on bestseller lists in Mexico and Colombia.
