= Robert Rosen (writer) =

American writer (born 1952)

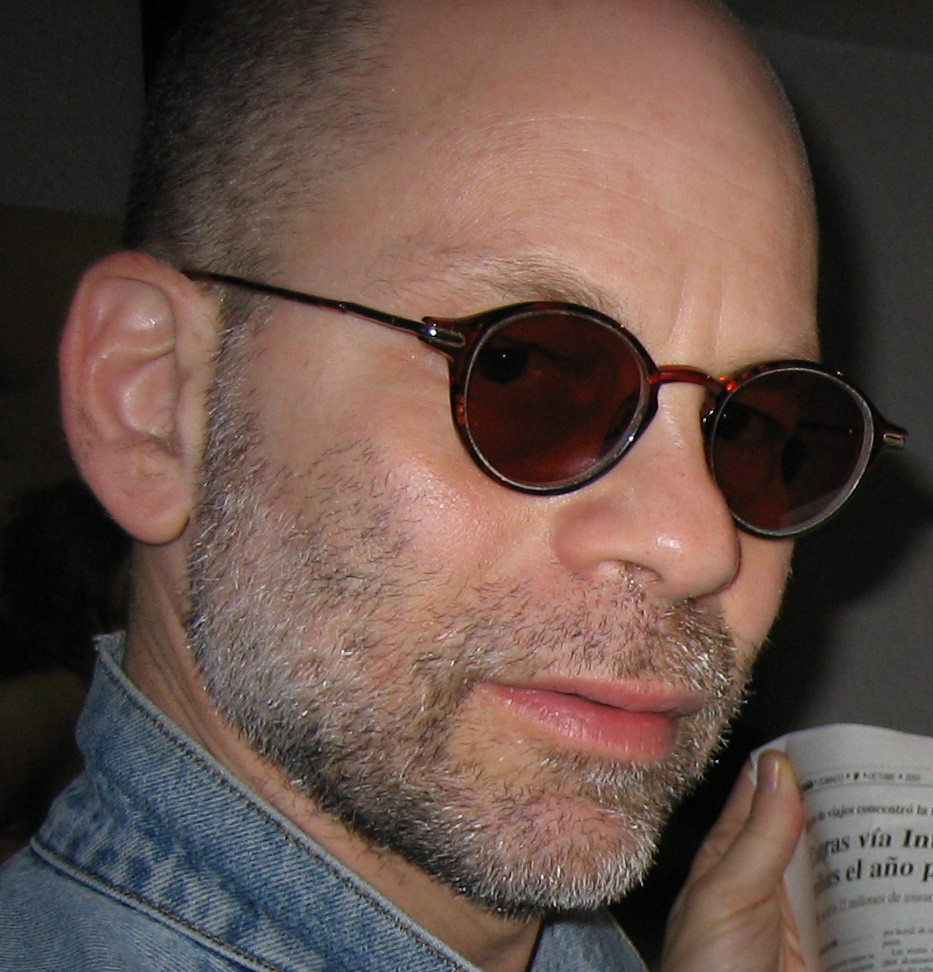
- Robert Rosen, Mexico City, October 9, 2005
- Born: Robert Jay Rosen; July 27, 1952 (age 74); Brooklyn, New York, United States
- Occupation: Writer
- Writing career
- Notable work: Nowhere Man: The Final Days of John Lennon (2000)

Robert Rosen is an American writer born in Brooklyn, New York, on July 27, 1952. He is the author of Nowhere Man: The Final Days of John Lennon, a controversial account of the ex-Beatle's last five years, based on Rosen’s memory of Lennon’s diaries.

His second book, Beaver Street: A History of Modern Pornography, was published by Headpress in the U.K. in 2011 and in the U.S. in 2012. The Erotic Review said of the book, "Beaver Street captures the aroma of pornography, bottles it, and gives it so much class you could put it up there with Dior or Chanel."

A memoir, Bobby in Naziland: A Tale of Flatbush, was published by Headpress in 2019. The Jewish Voice said that the book portrays Flatbush "with the characterizations and insight of a good novel.... But it really is the neighborhood that's the star of the story. You don’t have to be Jewish—or a Brooklynite—to be enchanted by this book." The book was re-released in 2022 as A Brooklyn Memoir: My Life as a Boy.

== Career ==
He attended the City College of New York. While there he wrote for Observation Post (OP), one of the student newspapers.

== Nowhere Man ==
In his book Nowhere Man: The Final Days of John Lennon, Rosen states that he recreated from memory portions of Lennon’s diaries and combined this information with details from his own diaries about what had happened since Lennon and Yoko Ono hired Frederick Seaman in February 1979. Seaman and Rosen had met while working at the City College student newspaper, OP. A version of the manuscript was completed in 1982. An expanded version was published 18 years later.
