= Murder of John Lennon =

1980 murder in New York City, US

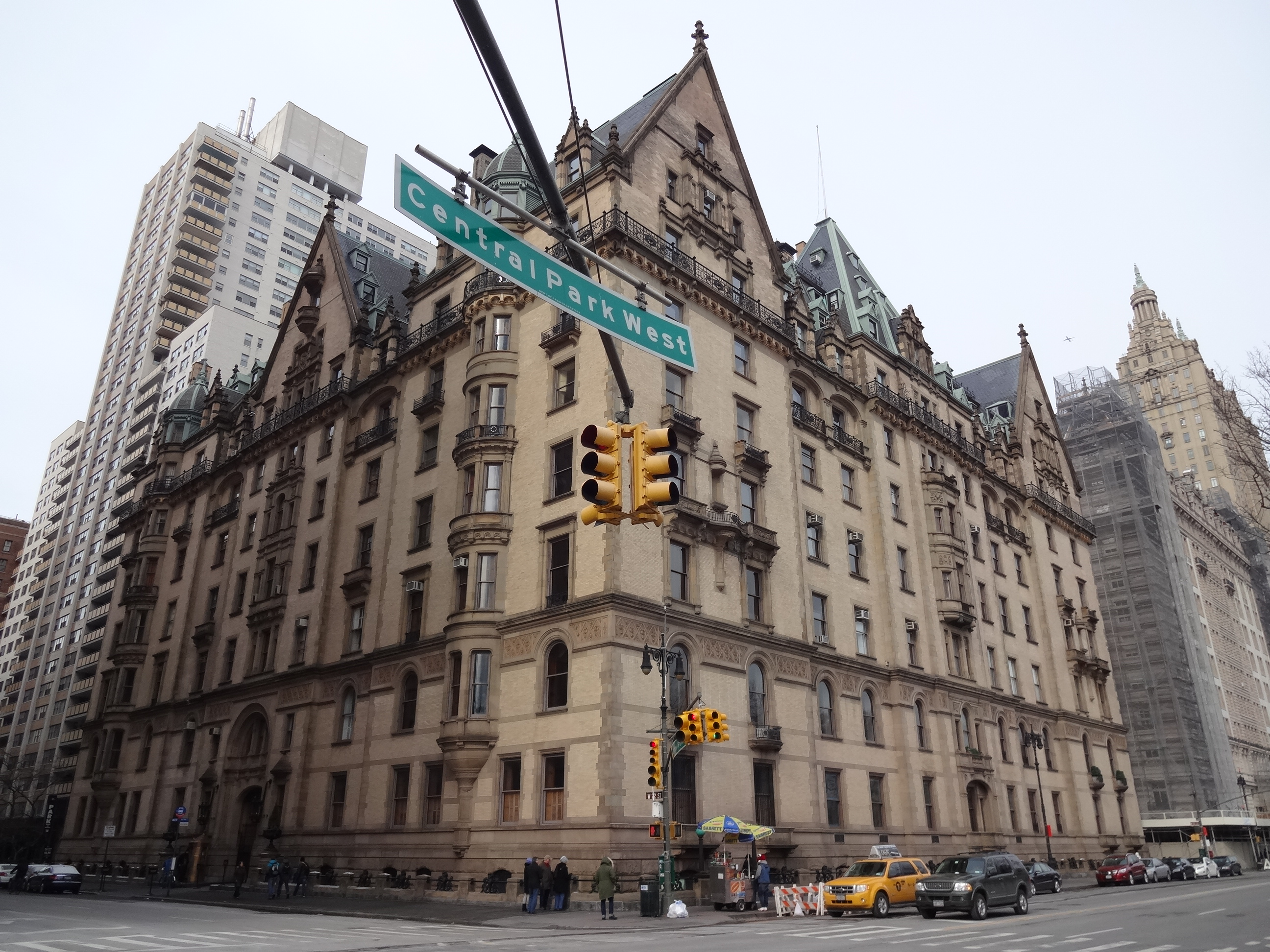
- The Dakota, the site of John Lennon's murder.
- Location: 40°46′35.6″N 73°58′34.8″W; The Dakota, New York City, U.S.
- Date: 8 December 1980; 45 years ago c. 10:50 p.m. (UTC−05:00)
- Target: John Lennon
- Attack type: Murder by shooting, assassination
- Weapon: Charter Arms Undercover .38 Special revolver
- Deaths: John Lennon
- Perpetrator: Mark David Chapman
- Motive: Personal resentment against Lennon and a desire to emulate Holden Caulfield

On the night of 8 December 1980, English musician John Lennon, formerly of the Beatles, was fatally shot in the archway of The Dakota, his residence in Manhattan, New York City. The shooter, Mark David Chapman, was an American Beatles fanatic who was envious and enraged by Lennon's lifestyle. Chapman was also inspired by the fictional character Holden Caulfield from J. D. Salinger's novel The Catcher in the Rye, which features a young protagonist who loathes hypocrisy.

Chapman planned the murder over several months. Earlier in the day, he had met Lennon, who signed his copy of the album Double Fantasy as Lennon and his wife, Yoko Ono, were leaving for a recording session at the Record Plant. Later that night when the couple returned home, Chapman, still waiting at the building's entrance, fired five hollow-point bullets from a .38 Special revolver, four of which hit Lennon in the back. Lennon was rushed to Roosevelt Hospital in a police car, where he was pronounced dead on arrival at 11:15 p.m. Chapman remained at the scene of the shooting reading The Catcher in the Rye until he was arrested by police.

The murder triggered a worldwide outpouring of grief, with crowds gathering outside Roosevelt Hospital and the Dakota. At least three Beatles fans died by suicide. The day after the murder, Lennon was cremated at Ferncliff Cemetery in Hartsdale, New York. In lieu of a funeral, Ono requested 10 minutes of silence around the world on 14 December. Chapman pleaded guilty to murdering Lennon and was given a sentence of 20 years to life imprisonment; he has been denied parole multiple times after becoming eligible in 2000.

== Background ==
=== Mark David Chapman ===
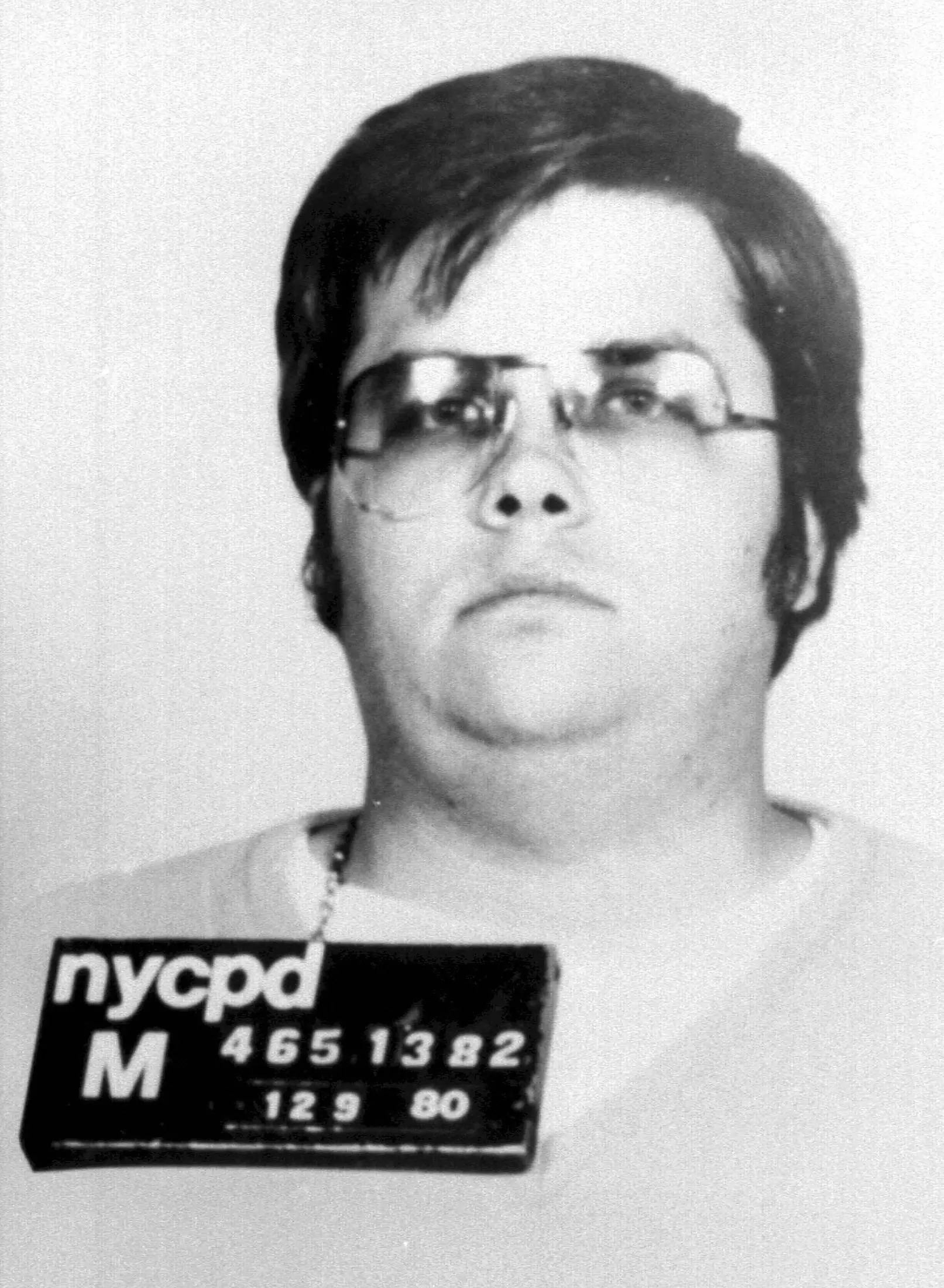
Mug shot of Chapman (9 Dec 1980)

Mark David Chapman, a 25-year-old former security guard from Honolulu, Hawaii, with no prior criminal convictions, was a fan of the Beatles. J. D. Salinger's novel The Catcher in the Rye (1951) had taken on great personal significance for Chapman, to the extent that he wished to model his life after the novel's protagonist, Holden Caulfield. One of the novel's main themes is Caulfield's rage against adult hypocrisy and "phonies". Chapman said that he had been enraged by Lennon's much-publicized remark in 1966 that the Beatles were "more popular than Jesus", and by the lyrics of Lennon's songs "God" (in which Lennon states that he does not believe in the Beatles, God, or Jesus) and "Imagine", where Lennon states "imagine no possessions", despite having a lavish lifestyle (as depicted in Anthony Fawcett's 1976 book John Lennon: One Day at a Time). Chapman concluded that the latter made Lennon a "phony".

On 27 October 1980, Chapman purchased a five-shot revolver, manufactured by Charter Arms and chambered in .38 Special, in Honolulu. He flew to New York City two days later after contacting the Federal Aviation Administration to learn the best way to transport a revolver. Chapman learned that bullets could be damaged during air travel, so he did not bring ammunition on the flight. Chapman left New York on 12 or 13 November, then flew back on 6 December and checked into a YMCA on the Upper West Side for a night before moving to a Sheraton hotel in Midtown Manhattan.

=== 8 December 1980 ===
Chapman waited for Lennon outside the Dakota in the early morning and spent most of the day near the entrance to the building, talking to fans and the doorman. That morning, Chapman was distracted and missed seeing Lennon step out of a taxi and enter the Dakota. Later in the morning, Chapman met Lennon's family nanny, Helen Seaman, who was returning from a walk with Lennon's five-year-old son, Sean. Chapman reached in front of the housekeeper to shake Sean's hand and said that he was a beautiful boy, quoting Lennon's song "Beautiful Boy (Darling Boy)".

Annie Leibovitz's portrait of Lennon and Ono, taken on the day of the murder. It has since been considered one of the most important photos of all time.

Annie Leibovitz, a portrait photographer, arrived at Lennon's apartment for a photo shoot intended for Rolling Stone magazine. Leibovitz assured Lennon and Ono that a photograph of the two of them naked together would make the front cover of the magazine. She captured several images of Lennon by himself, with one set to be on the cover. Although Ono was initially reluctant to pose nude, Lennon insisted that both he and his wife be on the cover, and after taking the pictures, Leibovitz left their apartment at 3:30 p.m. After the photo shoot, Lennon gave what would be his last interview, to San Francisco disc jockey Dave Sholin, writer Laurie Kaye, and recorder/producer Ron Hummel for a music show to be broadcast on the RKO Radio Network. At around 5:00 p.m., Lennon and Ono, delayed by a late limousine shared with the RKO Radio crew, left their apartment to mix the song "Walking on Thin Ice", an Ono song featuring Lennon on lead guitar, at the Record Plant.

As they left the building, Lennon and Ono were approached by Chapman, who asked for Lennon's autograph on a copy of his recently released album, Double Fantasy (1980). Lennon liked to give autographs or pictures, especially to those who had been waiting for long periods of time to meet him. Later, Chapman said, "He was very kind to me. Ironically, very kind and was very patient with me. The limousine was waiting ... and he took his time with me and he got the pen going and he signed my album. He asked me if I needed anything else. I said, 'No. No sir.' And he walked away. Very cordial and decent man." Paul Goresh, an amateur photographer and Lennon fan, took a photo of Lennon signing Chapman's album.

== Shooting ==
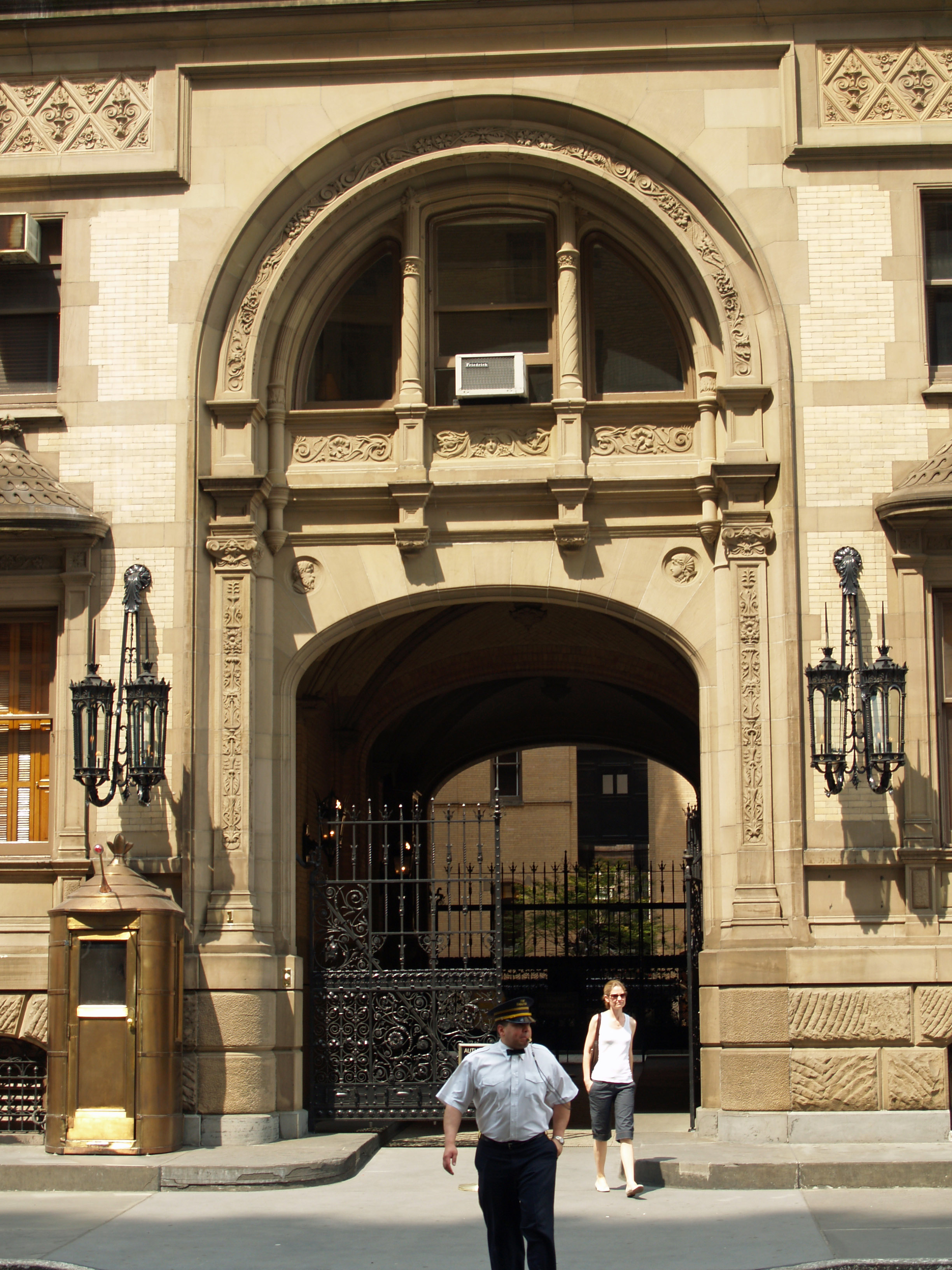
The 72nd Street entrance to the Dakota, where Lennon was shot

The Lennons returned to the Dakota around 10:50 p.m. Lennon wanted to say goodnight to Sean before going to the Stage Deli restaurant with Ono. The Lennons exited their limousine on 72nd Street instead of driving into the more secure courtyard of the Dakota. They passed Chapman as they walked toward the archway entrance of the building. As they passed Chapman, Lennon glanced briefly at Chapman, seemingly recognizing him from earlier that day. Seconds later, Chapman drew his revolver from his coat pocket, aimed it at the center of Lennon's back, and fired five hollow-point bullets from a distance of approximately nine to ten feet (2.7–3.0 m). One bullet missed and shattered a window. An eyewitness reported that Chapman called out "Mr. Lennon" and assumed a combat stance before firing. Chapman confirmed the combat stance in a 1992 interview with Barbara Walters, but testified at his 2008 parole hearing that he did not call out to Lennon.

According to the autopsy, two bullets entered the left side of Lennon's back, with one exiting through his chest and lung and the other lodging in his neck, and two more bullets hit his left shoulder. Lennon, bleeding profusely from external wounds and from his mouth, staggered up five steps to the lobby, crying, "I'm shot! I'm shot!" He then reached a back office adjacent to the lobby, where he fell to the floor, scattering the cassettes he had been carrying. Ono had followed immediately behind, and was screaming, "Get an ambulance. Get an ambulance."

José Perdomo, the doorman, shook the revolver out of Chapman's hand and kicked it across the pavement. Concierge worker Jay Hastings first started to make a tourniquet, but upon ripping open Lennon's blood-stained shirt and realizing the severity of his injuries, he covered Lennon's chest with his uniform jacket, removed his blood-covered glasses, and summoned the police. Chapman removed his coat and hat to show that he was not carrying any concealed weapons and remained standing on 72nd Street, waiting for police to arrive. Underneath his coat, he wore a promotional T-shirt for Todd Rundgren's album Hermit of Mink Hollow. Perdomo shouted at Chapman, "Do you know what you just did?", to which Chapman calmly replied, "I just shot John Lennon."

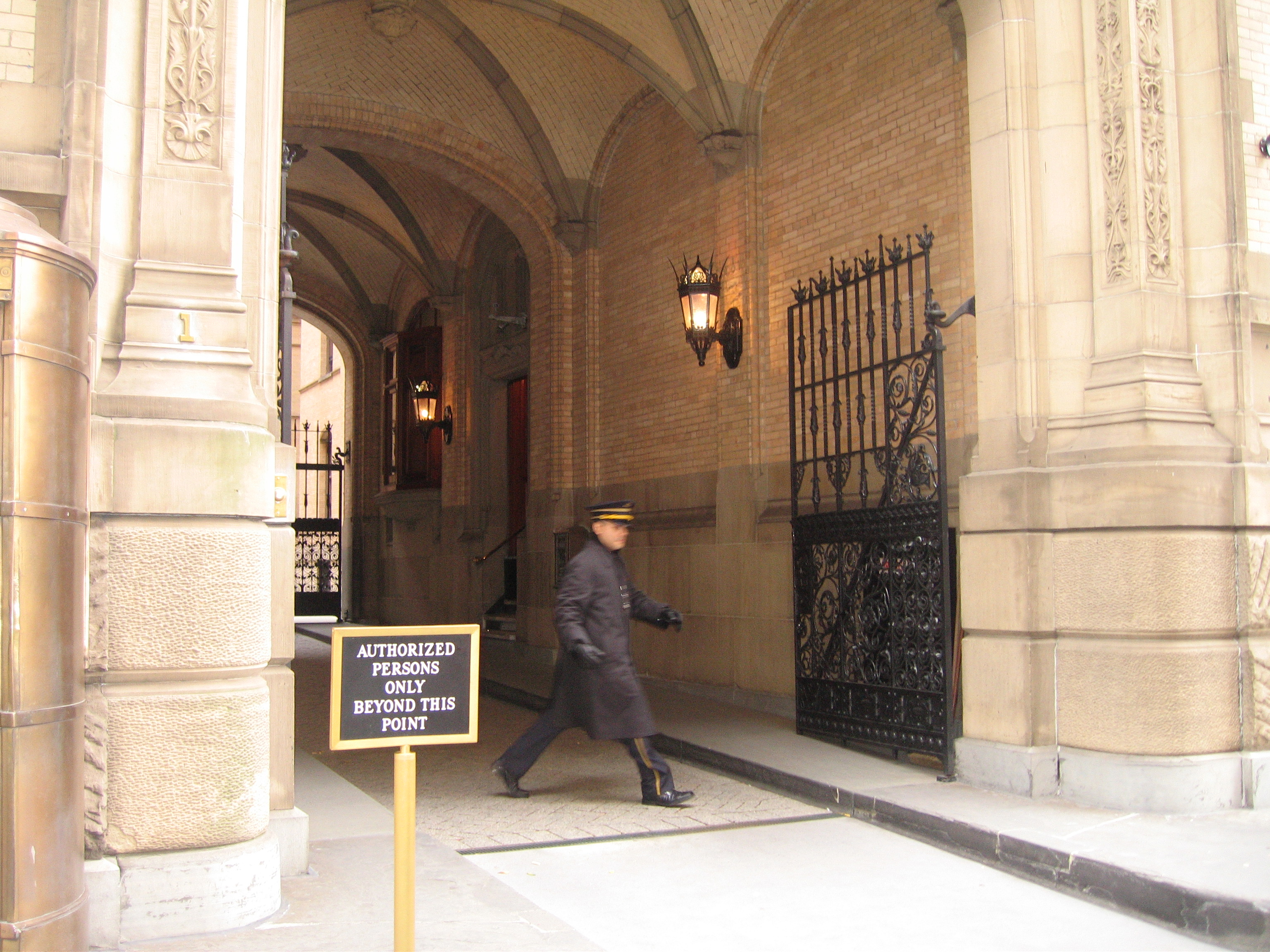
Side view of the Dakota archway, showing the steps Lennon climbed before he collapsed in the lobby

Officers Steven Spiro and Peter Cullen were the first policemen to arrive at the scene; they were at 72nd Street and Broadway when they heard a report of shots fired at the Dakota. The officers arrived about two minutes after the shooting and found Chapman standing very calmly on 72nd Street reading a paperback copy of The Catcher in the Rye. They immediately put Chapman in handcuffs and placed him in the back seat of their squad car. Chapman made no attempt to flee or resist arrest. Cullen said of Chapman: "He apologized to us for ruining our night. I turned around and said to him, 'You've got to be fucking kidding me. You're worried about our night? Do you know what you just did to your life?' We read him his rights more than once."

Officers Herb Frauenberger and Tony Palma were the second team to arrive on the scene. They found Lennon lying face down on the floor of the lobby, blood pouring from his mouth and his clothing already soaked with it, with Hastings attending to him. Officers James Moran and Bill Gamble soon arrived as well. Frauenberger put Lennon in Moran and Gamble's car, concluding his condition was too serious to wait for an ambulance to arrive. Moran and Gamble then drove Lennon to Roosevelt Hospital on West 59th Street, followed by Frauenberger and Palma, who drove Ono to that location. According to Gamble, in the car, Moran questioned Lennon regarding his identity. Lennon nodded, but could only manage to make a moaning and gurgling sound when he tried to speak, and lost consciousness shortly thereafter.

== Resuscitation attempt and death ==
If [Lennon] had been shot this way in the middle of the operating room with a whole team of surgeons ready to work on him ... he still wouldn't have survived his injuries.

— Stephan Lynn, head of the Emergency Department at Roosevelt Hospital

A few minutes before 11:00 p.m., Moran arrived at Roosevelt Hospital with Lennon in his squad car. Moran carried Lennon on his back and placed him onto a gurney, demanding a doctor for a multiple gunshot wound victim. When Lennon was brought in, he was not breathing and had no pulse. Three doctors, a nurse, and two or three other medical attendants worked on Lennon for 10 to 20 minutes in an attempt to resuscitate him. As a last resort, the doctors cut open his chest and attempted a resuscitative thoracotomy to restore circulation, but they quickly discovered that the damage to the blood vessels above and around Lennon's heart from the bullet wounds was too great.

Three of the four bullets that struck Lennon's back passed completely through his body and out of his chest, while the fourth lodged itself in his aorta beside his heart. One of the exiting bullets from Lennon's chest hit and became lodged in his upper left arm. Several of the wounds could have been fatal by themselves because each bullet had ruptured vital arteries around the heart. Lennon was shot four times at close range with hollow-point bullets and his affected organs—particularly his left lung and major blood vessels above his heart—were virtually destroyed upon impact.

Reports regarding who operated on and attempted to resuscitate Lennon have been inconsistent. Stephan Lynn, the head of the Emergency Department at Roosevelt Hospital, is usually credited with performing Lennon's surgery. In 2005, Lynn said that he massaged Lennon's heart and attempted to resuscitate him for 20 minutes, that two other doctors were present, and that the three of them declared Lennon's death. Richard Marks, an emergency room surgeon at Roosevelt Hospital, stated in 1990 that he operated on Lennon, administered a "massive" blood transfusion, and provided heart massage to no avail. "When I realized he wasn't going to make it," said Marks, "I just sewed him back up. I felt helpless." David Halleran, who had been a third-year general surgery resident at Roosevelt Hospital, disputed the accounts of both Marks and Lynn. In 2015, Halleran stated that the two doctors "didn't do anything", and that he did not initially realize the identity of the victim. He added that Lynn only came to assist him when he heard that the victim was Lennon.

According to his death certificate, Lennon was pronounced dead on arrival at 11:15 p.m., but the time of 11:07 p.m. has also been reported. Witnesses noted that the Beatles song "All My Loving" came over the hospital's sound system at the moment Lennon was pronounced dead. Lennon's body was then taken to the city morgue at 520 First Avenue for an autopsy. The cause of death was reported on his death certificate as "hypovolemic shock, caused by the loss of more than 80% of blood volume due to multiple through-and-through gunshot wounds to the left shoulder and left chest resulting in damage to the left lung, the left subclavian artery, and both the aorta and aortic arch". According to the report, even with prompt medical treatment, no person could have lived for more than a few minutes with many bullet wounds affecting all of the major arteries and veins around the heart.

== Media announcement ==
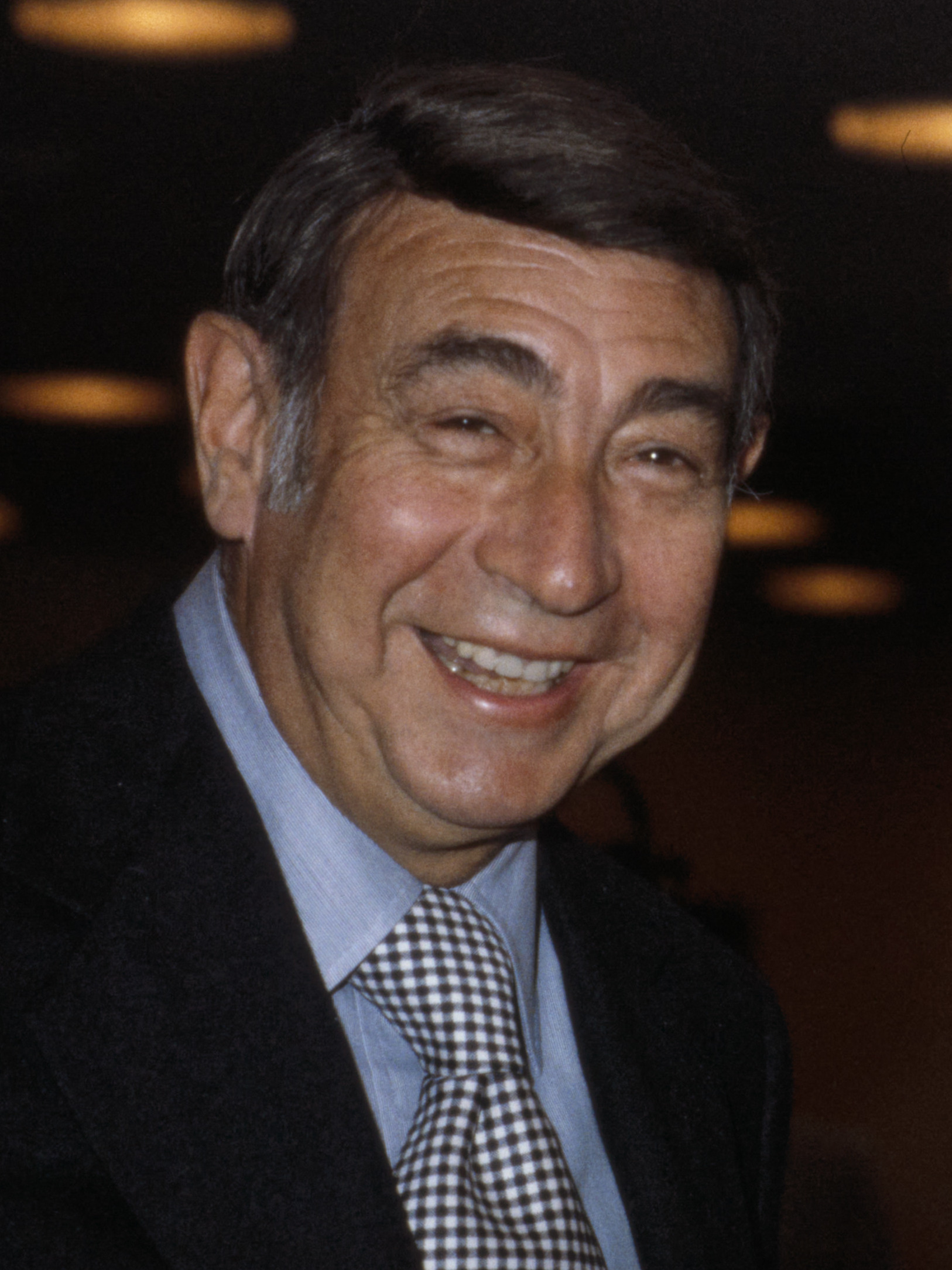
Howard Cosell, seen here in 1980, broke the news of Lennon's death on ABC's Monday Night Football

Ono asked Roosevelt Hospital not to report to the media that her husband was dead until she had informed their five-year-old son Sean, who was still at home at the Dakota. Ono said that he was probably watching television and that she did not want him to learn of his father's death from a TV announcement. However, news producer Alan J. Weiss of WABC-TV happened to be waiting for treatment in the emergency room after being injured in a motorcycle crash earlier in the evening. Police officers wheeled Lennon into the same room as Weiss and mentioned what happened. Weiss called his station and relayed the information.

Meanwhile, word reached Roone Arledge, who at the time was the president of both ABC News and ABC Sports as well as executive producer for Monday Night Football, which on this night featured a matchup between the New England Patriots and the Miami Dolphins. Arledge relayed the news to Frank Gifford and Howard Cosell, who had interviewed Lennon during a Monday Night Football broadcast in 1974, suggesting that they issue the report of the murder to the audience watching at home. Arledge asked Cosell to be the one to deliver the report, but he did not want to initially; Gifford convinced Cosell otherwise, saying, "You've got to. If you know it, we've got to do it. Don't hang on it. It's a tragic moment, and this is going to shake up the whole world."

The news was broken as follows:

Cosell: It's been a dramatic ballgame, but it's suddenly been placed in total perspective for us. I'll finish this; they're in the hurry-up offense.

Gifford: Third down, four. [Chuck] Foreman ... it'll be fourth down. [Matt] Cavanaugh will let it run down for one final attempt; he'll let the seconds tick off to give Miami no opportunity whatsoever. (Whistle blows.) Timeout is called; three seconds remaining; John Smith is on the line. And I don't care what's on the line, Howard, you have got to say what we know in the booth.

Cosell: Yes, we have to say it. Remember, this is just a football game, no matter who wins or loses. An unspeakable tragedy confirmed to us by ABC News in New York City: John Lennon, outside of his apartment building on the West Side of New York City – the most famous, perhaps, of all of the Beatles – shot twice in the back, rushed to Roosevelt Hospital, dead on arrival. Hard to go back to the game after that newsflash, which, in duty-bound, we have to take. Frank?

Gifford: (after a pause) Indeed, it is.

The first official confirmation of Lennon's death apparently came from Steve North, the news director for Long Island radio station WLIR, according to North and disc jockey Bob Waugh. North was doing a special comment on the recent murder of gun control advocate Michael J. Halberstam, when an intern ran in with the news about Lennon. North then read the AP wire bulletin and spoke several times with a police contact, who was finally able to confirm Lennon had died. Waugh has since released an aircheck from that night.

New York rock station WNEW immediately suspended all programming and opened its lines to calls from listeners. Stations throughout the country switched to special programming devoted to Lennon or Beatles music.

== Reactions ==
=== Lennon's associates ===
Lynn claimed that Yoko Ono responded to the news of her husband's death with extreme distress, banging her head against the hospital floor. His account is disputed by two nurses present at the scene. Ono herself refuted Lynn's version of events in a 2015 interview, stating that her priority was to remain calm and take care of her son, Sean. She was led away from the hospital by a policeman and Geffen Records president David Geffen. The following day, Ono issued a statement: "There is no funeral for John. Later in the week we will set the time for a silent vigil to pray for his soul. We invite you to participate from wherever you are at the time. ... John loved and prayed for the human race. Please pray the same for him. Love. Yoko and Sean."

George Harrison issued a prepared statement for the press: "After all we went through together, I had and still have great love and respect for him. I am shocked and stunned. To rob a life is the ultimate robbery in life. The perpetual encroachment on other people's space is taken to the limit with the use of a gun. It is an outrage that people can take other people's lives when they obviously haven't got their own lives in order." Harrison later privately told friends, "I just wanted to be in a band. Here we are, twenty years later, and some whack job has shot my mate. I just wanted to play guitar in a band."

Paul McCartney addressed reporters outside his Sussex home that morning and said, "I can't take it at the moment. John was a great man who'll be remembered for his unique contributions to art, music and peace. He is going to be missed by the whole world." Later that day, McCartney was leaving an Oxford Street recording studio when reporters asked him for his reaction; he concluded his response with, "Drag, isn't it? Okay, cheers, bye-bye". His apparently casual response was widely condemned. McCartney later clarified that he had intended no disrespect and simply was unable to articulate his shock and sadness. Reflecting on the day two years later, McCartney said the following: "How did I feel? I can't remember. I can't express it. I can't believe it. It was crazy. It was anger. It was fear. It was madness. It was the world coming to an end. And it was, 'Will it happen to me next?' I just felt everything. I still can't put into words. Shocking. And I ended up saying, 'It's a drag,' and that doesn't really sum it up."

Ringo Starr, who was in the Bahamas at the time, received a phone call from his stepchildren informing him about the murder. He flew to New York to console Ono and Sean.

In a 1995 interview with New Musical Express magazine, Rolling Stones guitarist Keith Richards claimed that he was just a few miles south of the Dakota (on Fifth Avenue) when he found out about Lennon's murder, whereupon Richards obtained a firearm of his own and searched the streets for the alleged killer.

=== Public response ===
The outpouring of grief, wonder and shared devastation that followed Lennon's death had the same breadth and intensity as the reaction to the killing of a world figure: some bold and popular politician, like John or Robert Kennedy, or a spiritual leader, like Martin Luther King Jr. But Lennon was a creature of poetic political metaphor, and his spiritual consciousness was directed inward, as a way of nurturing and widening his creative force. That was what made the impact, and the difference – the shock of his imagination, the penetrating and pervasive traces of his genius—and it was the loss of all that, in so abrupt and awful a way, that was mourned last week, all over the world.

— Jay Cocks, TIME, 22 December 1980

Former Prime Minister Harold Wilson called Lennon's death, "a great tragedy." Per Ono's wishes, on 14 December, millions of people around the world paused for 10 minutes of silence to remember Lennon, including 30,000 people gathered in Lennon's birthplace of Liverpool and over 100,000 people at the Naumburg Bandshell in Central Park, near the scene of the shooting. During this period, all radio stations in New York City ceased broadcasting.

At least three Beatles fans committed suicide after the murder, prompting Ono to publicly ask mourners not to give in to despair. On 18 January 1981, a full-page open letter from Ono appeared in The New York Times and The Washington Post. Titled "In Gratitude", it thanked the millions of people who mourned Lennon's loss and expressed a desire to commemorate his life and support her and Sean.

Double Fantasy, initially released to mixed reviews and modest sales, became a worldwide commercial success after the murder and won the Grammy Award for Album of the Year at the 24th Annual Grammy Awards.

== Aftermath ==
The day after the murder, Lennon's remains were cremated at Ferncliff Cemetery in Hartsdale, New York, and his ashes were scattered in Central Park, in sight of the Dakota. Chapman was taken to the NYPD's 20th Precinct on West 82nd Street, where he was questioned for eight hours before being brought to New York County Criminal Court on Centre Street in Lower Manhattan. A judge remanded Chapman to Bellevue Hospital for psychiatric evaluation.

Chapman was charged with the second-degree murder of Lennon, as premeditation in New York State was not sufficient to warrant a charge of first-degree murder. Despite advice by his lawyers to plead insanity, Chapman pleaded guilty to the murder, saying that his plea was the will of God. Under the terms of his plea, Chapman was sentenced to 20-years-to-life imprisonment with eligibility for parole in 2000. Before his sentencing, Chapman was given the opportunity to address the court, at which point he read a passage from The Catcher in the Rye. As of September 2025, Chapman has been denied parole 14 times and remains incarcerated at Green Haven Correctional Facility.

Ono released a solo album, Season of Glass, in 1981. The cover of the album is a photograph of the blood-splattered glasses that Lennon was wearing when he was shot. That same year, Ono also released the song "Walking on Thin Ice", which she and Lennon had mixed at the Record Plant on the day of the killing, as a single.

Three months after Lennon's murder, John Hinckley Jr. attempted to assassinate Ronald Reagan. Police later found a copy of The Catcher in the Rye among Hinckley's possessions, as well as a cassette tape in which Hinckley expressed sadness over Lennon's death and said he wished to make "some kind of statement" after it.

In June 2016, Dakota concierge Jay Hastings sold the shirt he was wearing when he tried to aid Lennon at an auction for $42,500.

== Memorials and tributes ==
=== Photography ===
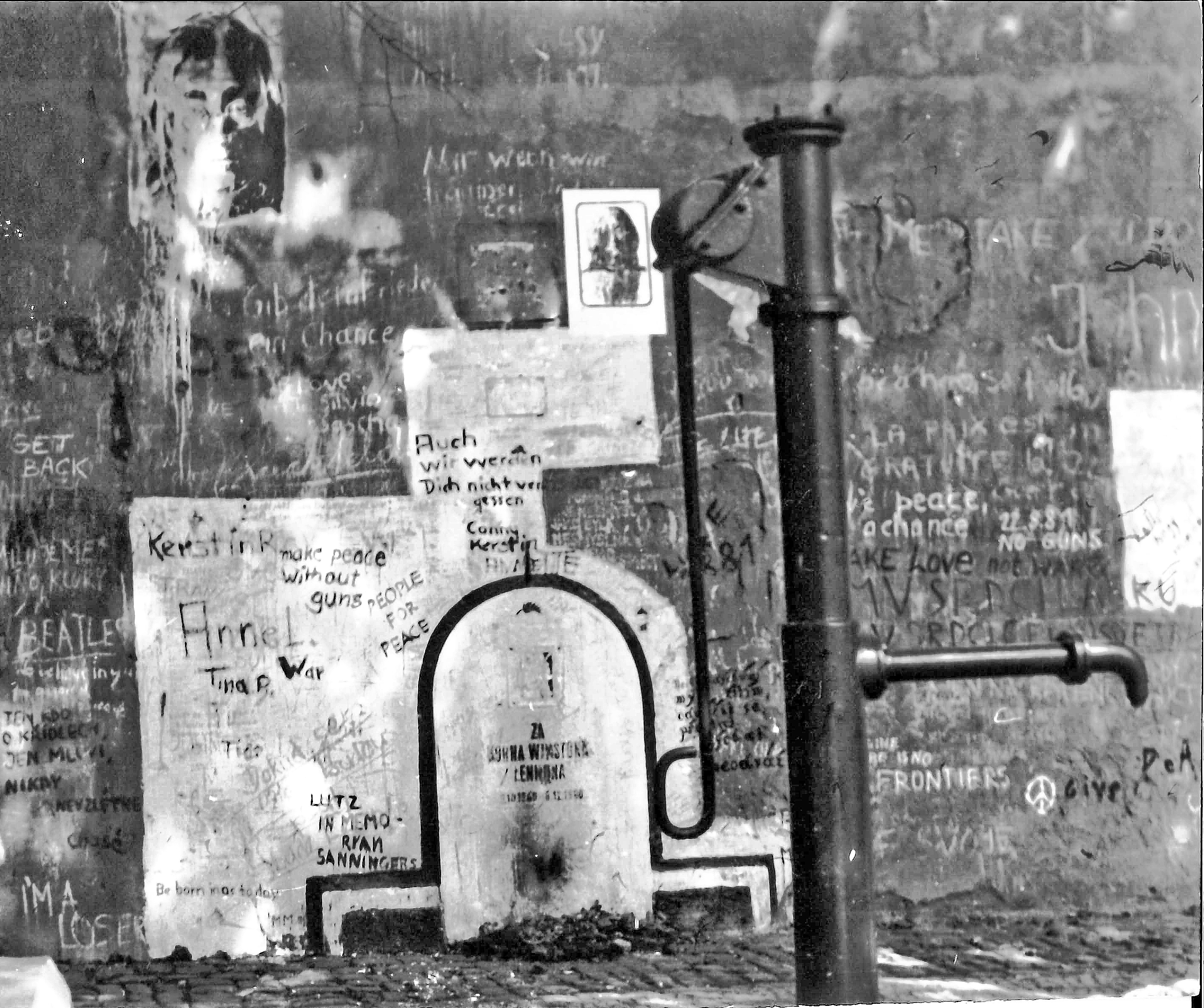
Memorial behind the Iron Curtain: Lennon Wall in Prague, August 1981

Leibovitz's photo of a naked Lennon embracing his wife, taken on the day of the murder, was the cover of the 22 January 1981 issue of Rolling Stone, most of which was dedicated to articles, letters, and photographs commemorating Lennon's life and death. In 2005, the American Society of Magazine Editors ranked it as the top magazine cover of the last forty years.

=== Events ===
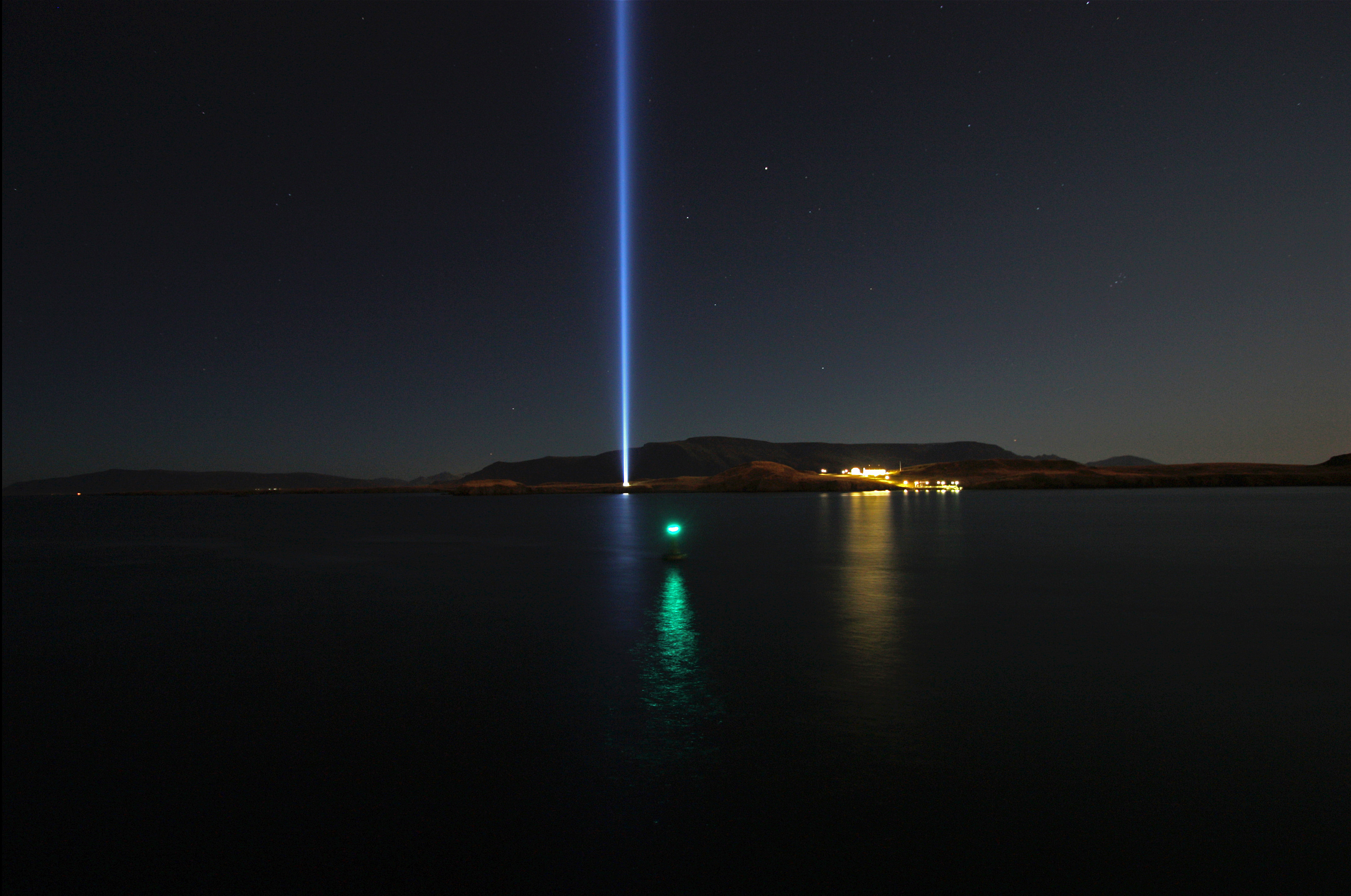
The Imagine Peace Tower (Icelandic: Friðarsúlan, meaning "the peace column") is a memorial to John Lennon from his widow, Yoko Ono, on Viðey Island in Faxaflói Bay near Reykjavík, Iceland.

- Every 8 December, a remembrance ceremony is held in front of the Capitol Records building on Vine Street in Hollywood, California. People also light candles in front of Lennon's Hollywood Walk of Fame star, outside the Capitol Building.
- On 28–30 September 2007, Durness held the John Lennon Northern Lights Festival, which was attended by Lennon's half-sister, Julia Baird, who read from his writings and her own books; and Stanley Parkes, Lennon's Scottish cousin.
- Ono places a lit candle in the window of Lennon's room in the Dakota every year on 8 December, while fans gather at the nearby Strawberry Fields memorial in Central Park for an all-day vigil, with musicians playing Lennon's songs while the crowd sings along.
- Every year from 9 October, Lennon's birthday, until 8 December, the date of Lennon's death, the Imagine Peace Tower in Iceland is lit.
- On 24 March 2018, Paul McCartney participated in the March for Our Lives, a protest against gun violence, because of Lennon's killing.

=== Music ===
- Bob Dylan wrote and recorded the song "Roll On John" on his 2012 album Tempest, which explicitly refers to the assassination ("They shot him in the back and down he went").
- David Bowie, who befriended Lennon while Lennon co-wrote and performed on Bowie's US #1 hit "Fame" in 1975, performed a tribute to Lennon in the final show of his Serious Moonlight Tour at the Hong Kong Coliseum, on 8 December 1983—the third anniversary of Lennon's death. Bowie said he last saw Lennon in Hong Kong, and performed Lennon's song "Imagine".
- George Harrison released a tribute song entitled "All Those Years Ago" in the spring of 1981, with Ringo Starr and Paul McCartney being credited as additional musicians. The following year in the spring of 1982, McCartney released a song entitled "Here Today" in honor of Lennon.
- Roxy Music recorded a cover version of Lennon's 1971 song "Jealous Guy" as a tribute single released in February 1981. The song reached No. 1 in the UK singles charts for two weeks.
- Elton John, who recorded the US number-one hit "Whatever Gets You thru the Night" with Lennon, teamed up with his lyricist Bernie Taupin for the tribute "Empty Garden (Hey Hey Johnny)". It appeared on his album Jump Up! (1982), and peaked at No. 13 on the US Singles Chart that year. When he performed the song at a sold-out concert in Madison Square Garden in August 1982, he was joined on stage by Ono and Sean.
- Paul Simon's homage to Lennon, "The Late Great Johnny Ace", initially sings of the rhythm and blues singer Johnny Ace, who is said to have shot himself in 1954, then goes on to refer to John Lennon, as well as President John F. Kennedy, who was assassinated in 1963, the year "Beatlemania" started. The song also appears on Simon's Hearts and Bones (1983) album.
- Queen performed "Imagine" the night after Lennon's death at Wembley Arena in London.
- Freddie Mercury wrote "Life Is Real (Song for Lennon)" as a tribute to John Lennon. The song appeared on the Queen album Hot Space (1982).
- The Bellamy Brothers mentioned Lennon's death in their 1985 single "Old Hippie".
- The Cranberries' 1996 album To the Faithful Departed includes a song about the murder, "I Just Shot John Lennon".
- XTC performed "Rain" and "Towers of London" in Liverpool the night after Lennon's death.
- The Chameleons’ 1983 album Script of the Bridge features a song about the murder, “Here Today”, written from the perspective of Lennon.
- Måneskin's 2023 album Rush! features an Italian language song about an obsessed fan stalking a celebrity titled after Mark Chapman.
- The Cleaners from Venus' 1984 song "Johnny the Moondog is dead" is a tribute to Lennon.
- In Prince's song "Annie Christian", from his fourth studio album Controversy (1981), he accuses a fictional character named Annie Christian of murdering Lennon.

=== Physical memorials ===
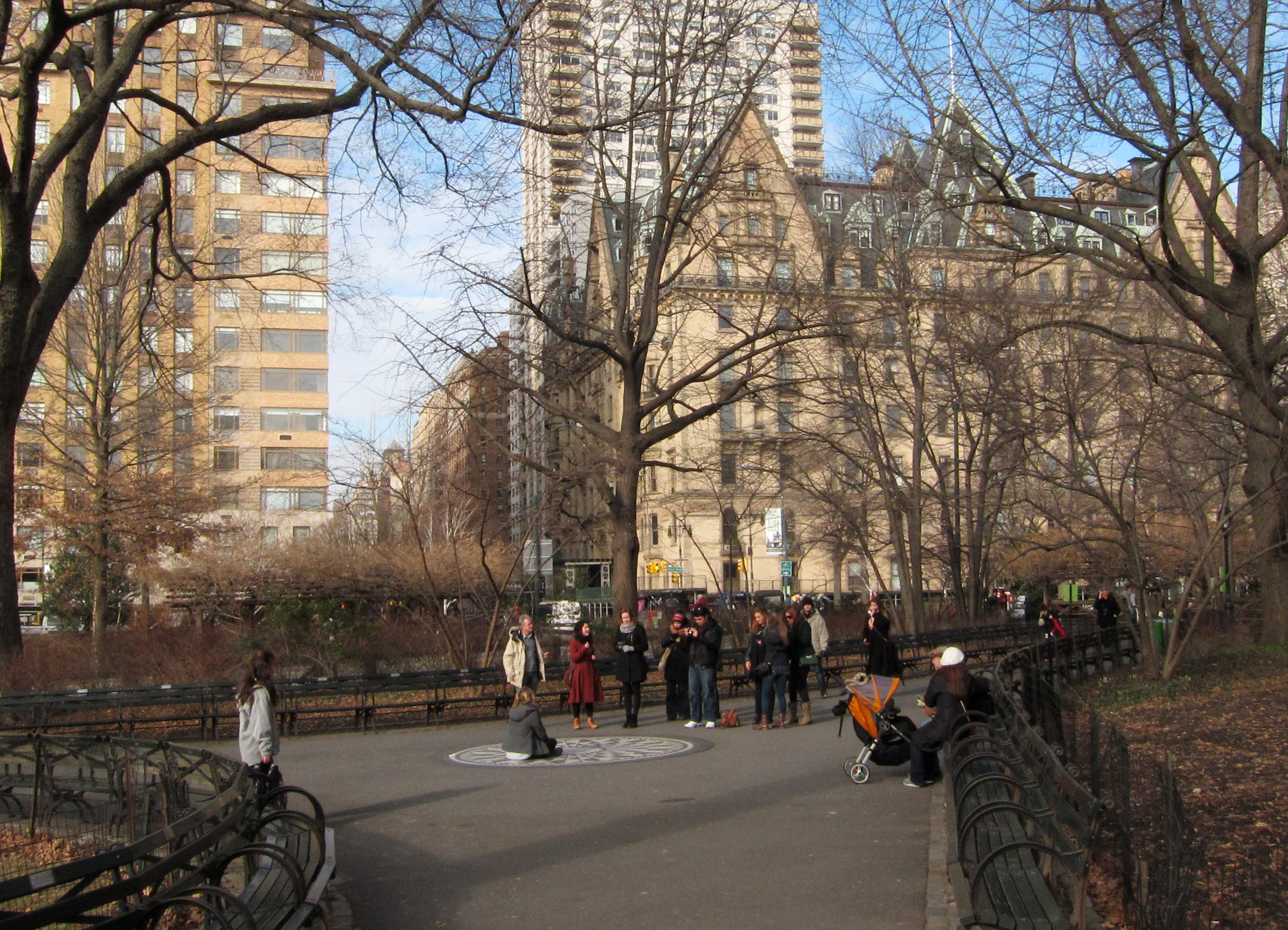
Strawberry Fields during wintertime, with the Dakota in the background

- In 1985, New York City dedicated an area of Central Park where Lennon had frequently walked, directly across from the Dakota, as Strawberry Fields. In a symbolic show of unity, countries from around the world donated trees, and the city of Naples, Italy, donated the Imagine mosaic centerpiece.
- On 9 October 2007, Ono dedicated in memory of Lennon a memorial called the Imagine Peace Tower, on the island of Viðey, off the coast of Reykjavík, Iceland. Every year, between 9 October and 8 December, the memorial projects a vertical beam of light into the sky.
- In 2009, the New York City annex of the Rock and Roll Hall of Fame hosted a special John Lennon exhibit that included many mementos and personal effects from Lennon's life, as well as the clothes he was wearing when he was murdered, still in the brown paper bag from Roosevelt Hospital.
- In 2018, Ono created an artwork in John Lennon's memory, titled "Sky", for MTA Arts & Design. The artwork was installed during the renovation of the 72nd Street station on the New York City Subway (served by the B and C trains), outside the Dakota.

=== Operas ===
- Former president of Croatia Ivo Josipović composed an opera called Lennon about the murder of John Lennon. In the opera, Lennon has a series of flashbacks during the murder, in which he remembers the most important moments and people in his life.

== Depiction in films ==
- The Killing of John Lennon (2006), focuses on Chapman's life up to the murder.
- Chapter 27 (2007), based on Jack Jones's book Let Me Take You Down, attempts a nonjudgmental portrayal of Chapman.
- The Lennon Report (2016) focuses on attempts by doctors and nurses to save Lennon's life.

== Conspiracy theories ==
The Central Intelligence Agency (CIA) and Federal Bureau of Investigation (FBI) spied on Lennon due to his left-wing activism and the actions of Chapman during the murder or subsequent legal proceedings have led to conspiracy theories postulating CIA involvement:

- Fenton Bresler, a barrister and journalist, raised the idea of CIA involvement in the murder in his 1990 book Who Killed John Lennon? Bresler alleges that Chapman may have been brainwashed by the CIA as an assassin, such as in The Manchurian Candidate, to "silence" Lennon before his potential re-emergence as a political leader in the 1980s. Fenton Bresler argues Chapman's 1975 world travels (including to Beirut, a CIA hub at the time) were for "conditioning" and mental programming, a separate theory goes as far as to claim Stephen King of being the real shooter.
- Liverpool playwright Ian Carroll staged a drama, One Bad Thing, conveying the theory Chapman was manipulated by a rogue wing of the CIA "who wanted Lennon off the scene".
- Salvador Astrucia argued that forensic evidence proves Chapman did not commit the murder in his 2004 book Rethinking John Lennon's Assassination: The FBI's War on Rock Stars.
- The 2010 documentary The Day John Lennon Died suggests that Chapman was merely a "patsy" who never fired the fatal shots and instead alleges that Jose Perdomo, the doorman at the Dakota, a Cuban exile with links to the CIA and the Bay of Pigs invasion was in fact responsible for firing the shots that killed Lennon.
