= Mark David Chapman =

Murderer of John Lennon (born 1955)

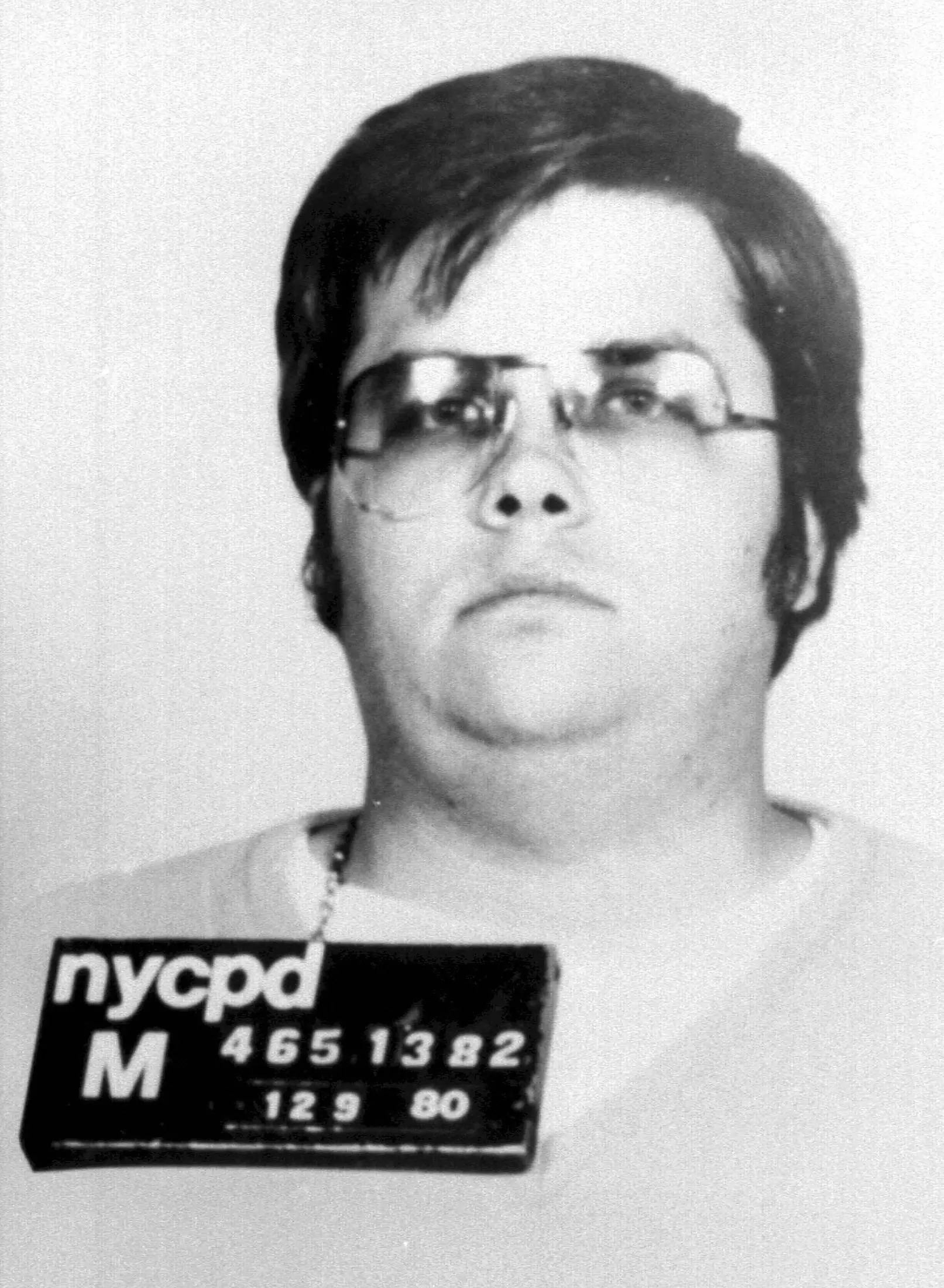
- Chapman's 1980 mugshot
- Born: May 10, 1955 (age 71); Fort Worth, Texas, U.S.
- Occupations: Unemployed; former security guard
- Known for: Murder of John Lennon
- Spouse: Gloria Abe (m. 1979)
- Status: Incarcerated
- Motive: Personal resentment against John Lennon and a desire to emulate Holden Caulfield
- Conviction: Second-degree murder
- Penalty: 20 years to life imprisonment

Details
- Imprisoned at: Green Haven Correctional Facility, New York, U.S.

Mark David Chapman (born May 10, 1955) is an American man who murdered English musician John Lennon in New York City on December 8, 1980. As Lennon walked into the archway of the Dakota, his apartment building on the Upper West Side, Chapman fired five shots at him from a few yards away with a Charter Arms Undercover .38 Special revolver; Lennon was hit four times from the back. He was rushed to Roosevelt Hospital and pronounced dead on arrival. Chapman remained at the scene following the shooting and made no attempt to flee or resist arrest. Instead, he sat reading The Catcher in the Rye to fulfill a personal parasocial fantasy.

Raised in Decatur, Georgia, Chapman was a fan of the Beatles but later grew infuriated by Lennon's lavish lifestyle, the lyrics of "God" and "Imagine", and public statements such as his remark about the band being "more popular than Jesus". The J. D. Salinger novel The Catcher in the Rye took on great personal significance for Chapman, to the extent that he wished to model his life after its protagonist, Holden Caulfield, and planned to cite it as his manifesto. Chapman also contemplated killing other public figures, including Paul McCartney and Ronald Reagan. He had no prior criminal convictions and had recently resigned from a job as a security guard in Hawaii.

Chapman's legal team initially intended to mount an insanity defense based on the testimony of mental health experts who said that he was in a delusional psychotic state at the time of the shooting. However, he was more cooperative with the prosecutor, who argued that his symptoms fell short of a schizophrenia diagnosis. As the trial approached, Chapman instructed his lawyers that he wanted to plead guilty to murder based on what he had decided was the will of God. The judge granted Chapman's request and deemed him competent to stand trial. He was sentenced to a prison term of 20 years to life with a stipulation that mental health treatment would be provided.

Chapman refused requests for press interviews during his first six years in prison; he later said that he regretted the murder and did not intend to seek fame and notoriety. He ultimately supplied audiotaped interviews to journalist Jack Jones, who used them to write the 1992 investigative book Let Me Take You Down: Inside the Mind of Mark David Chapman. In 2000, Chapman became eligible for parole, which has since been denied 14 times.

== Early life ==
Chapman was born on May 10, 1955, in Fort Worth, Texas. His father, David Chapman, was a staff sergeant in the United States Air Force and his mother, Diane (née Pease), was a nurse. His younger sister, Susan, was born seven years later. As a boy, Chapman stated he lived in fear of his father, who he claimed was physically abusive towards his mother and unloving towards him. Chapman began to fantasize about having God-like power over a group of imaginary "little people" who lived in the walls of his bedroom.

Chapman and his family moved to the Atlanta suburb of Decatur, Georgia, at an early age and attended Columbia High School. He later recalled being targeted by bullies due to being overweight and lacking athleticism. By the time he was 14, Chapman embarked on a rebellious phase and was using drugs and skipping classes, and at one point ran away from home to live on the streets of Miami for two weeks until a kind stranger brought him in and bought Chapman a bus ticket home.

In 1971 after his rebellious phase, Chapman became a born-again Presbyterian and distributed biblical tracts. He met his first girlfriend, Jessica Blankenship, and began work as a summer camp counselor at the YMCA in DeKalb County, Georgia. He was immensely popular with the children at the camp, who nicknamed him "Nemo" (after the protagonist of the Jules Verne novel Twenty Thousand Leagues Under the Seas), and he was promoted to assistant director after winning an award for Outstanding Counselor. Those who knew Chapman in the caretaking professions said he was an outstanding worker.

On the recommendation of a friend, Chapman read J. D. Salinger's novel The Catcher in the Rye (1951). The novel eventually took on great personal significance for him, to the extent he reportedly wished to model his life after its main character, Holden Caulfield. After graduating from high school, Chapman moved for a time to Chicago and played guitar in churches and Christian night spots while his friend Micheal McFarland did stand up comedy impersonations. After his stint in Chicago, Chapman worked successfully for World Vision with Vietnamese refugees at a resettlement camp at Fort Chaffee in Arkansas, after a brief visit to Lebanon for the same work. He was named an area coordinator and a key aide to program director David Moore, who later said Chapman cared deeply for children and worked hard. Chapman accompanied Moore to meetings with government officials, and U.S. president Gerald Ford shook his hand.

Chapman joined Blankenship as a student at Covenant College, a Presbyterian liberal arts college in Lookout Mountain, Georgia. However, he fell behind in his studies and became racked with guilt over having a previous affair. He started having suicidal thoughts and began to feel like a failure. He dropped out of Covenant College after just one semester, and his girlfriend broke off their relationship soon after. Chapman returned to work at the resettlement camp but left after an argument with a supervisor.

In 1977, Chapman—spending the last of his savings—impulsively relocated to Hawaii, where he attempted suicide by carbon monoxide asphyxiation. He connected a hose to his rented car's exhaust pipe, but the hose melted and the attempt failed after a mysterious Japanese fisherman knocked on his car window and vanished which made Chapman believe that the fisherman was an angel sent from God to save him. A psychiatrist based in Kailua admitted Chapman to Castle Memorial Hospital’s psychiatric ward for clinical depression and was placed on suicide watch. Upon his release, he began working at the hospital as a maintenance worker and was popular with his fellow workers and often socialized with doctors and nurses. After Chapman's parents began divorce proceedings, his mother joined him in Hawaii.

In 1978, Chapman embarked on a six-week trip around the world. The vacation was partly inspired by the film and novel Around the World in 80 Days. Using his YMCA connections for free or discounted accommodations, Chapman visited Tokyo, Seoul, Hong Kong, Singapore, Bangkok, New Delhi, Beirut, Tehran, Geneva, London, Paris and Dublin. The trip concluded with a brief visit to Atlanta to see his family and old friends. He also began a romantic relationship with his travel agent, a Japanese American woman named Gloria Abe, whom he married on June 2, 1979. Chapman got a job at Castle Memorial Hospital as a printer, working alone rather than with staff and patients. He was fired by the hospital for disorderly conduct but was later rehired but resigned for good after an argument with a nurse. After this, Chapman took a job as an unarmed night security guard at a high-end apartment complex and began drinking heavily to cope with depression.

As his psychological state worsened, Chapman developed a series of obsessions, including artwork, The Catcher in the Rye, and the English musician John Lennon. In September 1980 he wrote a letter to a friend, Lynda Irish, in which he stated, "I'm going nuts." He signed the letter, "The Catcher in the Rye." Chapman had no criminal convictions prior to his trip to New York City to kill Lennon.

== Murder of John Lennon ==
=== Motive and planning ===
Chapman reportedly started planning to kill Lennon three months prior to the murder. A longtime fan of Lennon's former band the Beatles, Chapman turned against Lennon due to a religious conversion and Lennon's highly publicized 1966 remark about the Beatles being "more popular than Jesus." Some members of Chapman's prayer group made a joke in reference to Lennon's song "Imagine": "It went, 'Imagine, imagine if John Lennon was dead.'" One of Chapman's childhood friends, Miles McManushe, recalled that Chapman said that the song was "communist."

Chapman had also been influenced by Anthony Fawcett's John Lennon: One Day at a Time, which detailed Lennon's lavish lifestyle in New York City. According to Gloria, "He was angry that Lennon would preach love and peace but yet have millions." Chapman later said, "He told us to imagine no possessions and there he was, with millions of dollars and yachts and farms and country estates, laughing at people like me who had believed the lies and bought the records and built a big part of their lives around his music." He also recalled having listened to Lennon's solo albums in the weeks before the murder:

I would listen to this music and I would get angry at him, for saying [in the song "God"] that he didn't believe in God, that he just believed in him and Yoko, and that he didn't believe in the Beatles. This was another thing that angered me, even though this record had been done at least ten years previously. I just wanted to scream out loud, "Who does he think he is, saying these things about God and heaven and the Beatles?" Saying that he doesn't believe in Jesus and things like that. At that point, my mind was going through a total blackness of anger and rage. So I brought the Lennon book home, into this The Catcher in the Rye milieu where my mindset is Holden Caulfield and anti-phoniness.

Chapman's planning has been described as "muddled." Over the years, he has both supported and denied whether he felt justified by his spiritual beliefs at the time or had the intention of acquiring notoriety. The only time he made a public statement before his sentencing—and for several years afterward—was during a brief psychotic episode in which he was convinced that the meaning of his actions was to promote The Catcher in the Rye, which amounted to a single letter mailed to The New York Times asking the public to read the novel.

Journalist James R. Gaines, who interviewed Chapman extensively, concluded that Chapman did not kill Lennon to gain fame and notoriety. According to Chapman in a later parole hearing, he had a hit list of other potential targets in mind, including Lennon's bandmate Paul McCartney, talk show host Johnny Carson, actress Elizabeth Taylor, actor George C. Scott, former first lady Jacqueline Kennedy Onassis, then recently elected U.S. President Ronald Reagan and Hawaii governor George Ariyoshi. In 2010, Chapman said that the only criterion for the list was being "famous," and that he chose Lennon out of convenience. He had also cited feelings of envy.

It is rumored that Chapman traveled to Woodstock, New York, during one of his visits to the state in search of the musician Todd Rundgren, another target of obsession. Chapman was wearing a promotional T-shirt for Rundgren's album Hermit of Mink Hollow when he was arrested and had a copy of Runt: The Ballad of Todd Rundgren in his Manhattan hotel room. Rundgren was not aware of the connections until much later.

On the day of the murder, singer David Bowie was appearing on Broadway in the play The Elephant Man. "I was second on his list," Bowie later said. "Chapman had a front-row ticket to The Elephant Man the next night. John and Yoko were supposed to sit front-row for that show too. So the night after John was killed there were three empty seats in the front row. I can't tell you how difficult that was to go on. I almost didn't make it through the performance."

=== October–December 1980 ===
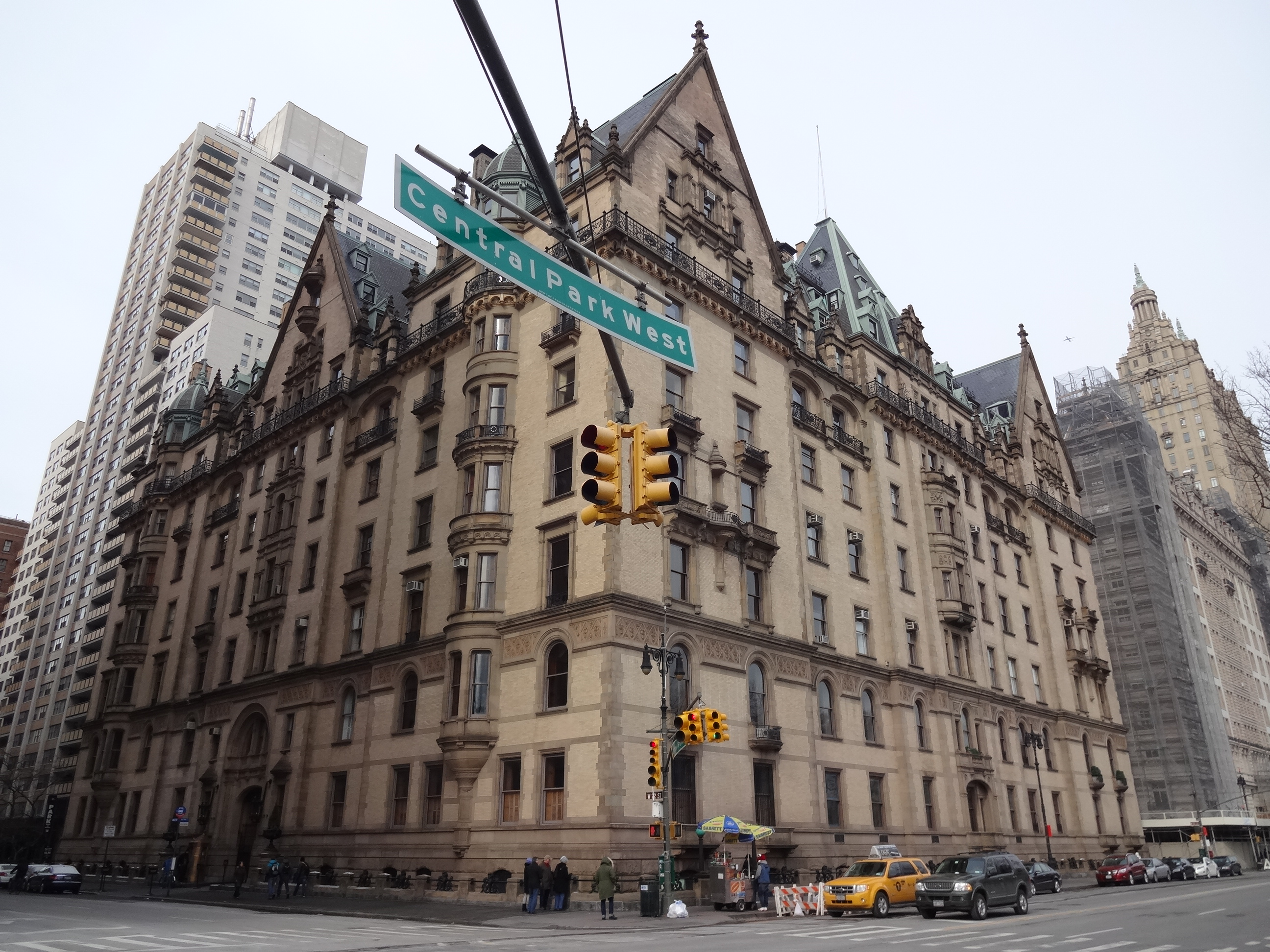
The Dakota, Lennon's residence and the location of the shooting

Chapman went to New York City in late October 1980 intending to kill Lennon but was unable to purchase bullets due to New York State law. He left to obtain ammunition from his unwitting friend Dana Reeves in Atlanta before returning in November. While in New York, Chapman was inspired by the film Ordinary People to stop his plans. He returned to Hawaii and told his wife Gloria that he had been obsessed with killing Lennon, showing her the gun and bullets; Gloria was reported to be extremely shocked and did not inform the police or mental health services. Chapman later said that the commandment "thou shalt not kill" flashed on the television at him and was on a wall hanging that his wife put up in their apartment. He made an appointment to see a clinical psychologist, but did not keep it and flew back to New York on December 6, 1980 and lied to his wife that he got rid of the gun. At one point, he considered ending his life by jumping from the Statue of Liberty.

On December 7, Chapman accosted singer James Taylor at the 72nd Street subway station. According to Taylor, "The guy had sort of pinned me to the wall and was glistening with maniacal sweat and talking some freak speak about what he was going to do and his stuff with how John was interested and he was going to get in touch with John Lennon." He also reportedly offered cocaine to a taxi driver. That night, Chapman and his wife talked on the phone about getting help with his problems by first working on his relationship with God.

On the morning of December 8, Chapman left his room at the Sheraton Hotel, leaving a shrine of personal items behind that he wanted the police to find which included a poster of a film still from The Wizard of Oz which was one of his favourite films, the hotel Bible which was opened to the Gospel of John with the word “Lennon” written next to John and a letter praising his past achievements in World Vision. At a nearby bookstore, Chapman bought a copy of The Catcher in the Rye in which he wrote "this is my statement", and signed it "Holden Caulfield." He then spent most of the day near the entrance to the Dakota apartment building where Lennon lived, talking to fans and the doorman. Early in the morning, Chapman was chatting with fans and missed seeing Lennon step out of a taxi and enter the Dakota." Later in the morning, he met Lennon's housekeeper, who was returning from a walk with Lennon's five-year-old son Sean. Chapman reached in front of the housekeeper to shake Sean's hand and called him a beautiful boy, quoting Lennon's song "Beautiful Boy (Darling Boy)".

Around 5 p.m., Lennon and his wife Yoko Ono were leaving the Dakota for a recording session at the Record Plant. As they walked toward their limousine, Chapman, without saying a word, held out a copy of Lennon's album Double Fantasy (1980) for Lennon to sign. Amateur photographer Paul Goresh was standing nearby and took a picture as Lennon signed the album. Chapman said in an interview that he tried to get Goresh to stay, and he asked another loitering Lennon fan, Jude Stein, to go on a date with him that night. In 1992, Chapman suggested that he would not have murdered Lennon that night if Stein had accepted his invitation or if Goresh had stayed, but he would have returned to the Dakota the following day.

Around 10:50 p.m., Lennon and Ono returned to the Dakota in a limousine. Yoko got out of the vehicle first, passed Chapman, and walked toward the archway entrance of the building. Lennon exited the limousine and walked past him. From the sidewalk behind them, Chapman fired five hollow-point bullets from a .38 special revolver, four of which hit Lennon in the back and shoulder and one shot narrowly missed Lennon’s head and hit a light above him. One newspaper later reported that Chapman called out "Mr. Lennon" and dropped into a combat stance before firing. Chapman said that he does not recall saying anything, and Lennon did not turn around.

Chapman made no effort to flee the scene despite having many convenient escape routes available and instead remained at the scene following the shooting and appeared to be reading The Catcher in the Rye when New York City police officers arrived and arrested him without incident. The officers recognized that Lennon's wounds were severe and decided not to wait for an ambulance; they rushed him to Roosevelt Hospital in a squad car. Lennon was pronounced dead on arrival despite great efforts by doctors to resuscitate him. Three hours later, Chapman told the police, "I'm sure the big part of me is Holden Caulfield, who is the main person in the book. The small part of me must be the Devil."

== Legal process ==
Chapman was formally charged with second-degree murder, the most serious murder charge in New York State law for killing a victim who was not a law officer. He confessed to police that he had used hollow-point bullets "to ensure Lennon's death." Chapman's wife had known of her husband's preparations for killing Lennon, but took no action because Chapman did not follow through at the time; she did not face any charges. Chapman later said that he harbored a "deep-seated resentment" toward his wife, "that she didn't go to somebody, even the police, and say, 'Look, my husband's bought a gun and he says he's going to kill John Lennon.'"

=== Mental state assessment ===
More than a dozen psychologists and psychiatrists interviewed Chapman in the six months prior to his trial—three for the prosecution, six for the defense, and several more on behalf of the court—and they conducted a battery of standard diagnostic procedures and more than 200 hours of clinical interviews. All six defense experts concluded that Chapman was psychotic; five diagnosed paranoid schizophrenia, while the sixth felt that his symptoms were more consistent with manic depression. The three prosecution experts declared that his delusions fell short of psychosis and instead diagnosed various personality disorders. The court-appointed experts concurred with the prosecution's examiners that he was delusional yet competent to stand trial. In the examinations, Chapman was more cooperative with the prosecution's mental health experts than with those for the defense; one psychiatrist conjectured that he did not wish to be considered "crazy" and was persuaded that the defense experts declared him insane only because they were hired to do so.

Charles McGowan, who had been the pastor of Chapman's church in Decatur, visited Chapman. "I believe there was a demonic power at work," he said. Chapman initially embraced his old religion with new fervor as a result; but McGowan revealed information to the press that Chapman had told him in confidence, so Chapman disavowed his renewed interest in Christianity and reverted to his initial explanation: he had killed Lennon to promote the reading of The Catcher in the Rye.

=== Guilty plea ===
Chapman's pro bono court-appointed public defender, Herbert Adlerberg, withdrew from the case amid threats of lynching. Police, fearing that angry Lennon fans might decide to storm the hospital (which had its windows painted black due to fears of snipers), transferred Chapman, who was wrapped up in a thick bullet proof vest flanked by police officers, to Rikers Island for his personal safety.

At the initial hearing in January 1981, Chapman's new lawyer, Jonathan Marks, instructed him to enter a plea of not guilty by reason of insanity. In February, Chapman sent a handwritten statement to The New York Times urging everyone to read The Catcher in the Rye, calling it an "extraordinary book that holds many answers." The defense team sought to establish witnesses as to Chapman's mental state at the time of the killing. However, Chapman told Marks in June that he wanted to drop the insanity defense and plead guilty. Marks objected with "serious questions" over Chapman's sanity and legally challenged his competence to make this decision. In the pursuant hearing on June 22, Chapman said that God had told him to plead guilty and that he would never change his plea or ever appeal, regardless of his sentence. Marks told the court that he opposed Chapman's change of plea, but Chapman would not listen to him. Judge Dennis Edwards Jr. refused a further assessment, saying that Chapman had made the decision of his own free will, and declared him competent to stand trial.

=== Sentencing hearing ===
The sentencing hearing took place on August 24, 1981, in a crowded courtroom filled with members of the press. Two experts gave evidence on Chapman's behalf. Judge Edwards interrupted Dorothy Lewis, a research psychiatrist who was relatively inexperienced in the courtroom, indicating that the purpose of the hearing was to determine the sentence and there was no question of Chapman's criminal responsibility. Lewis had maintained that Chapman's decision to change his plea did not appear reasonable or explicable, and she implied that the judge did not want to allow an independent competency assessment. The district attorney argued that Chapman committed the murder as an easy venture to acquire fame. Chapman was asked if he had anything to say, and he rose and read a passage from The Catcher in the Rye in which Holden tells his little sister Phoebe what he wants to do with his life:

I keep picturing all these little kids playing some game in this big field of rye and all. Thousands of little kids, and nobody's around – nobody big, I mean – except me. And I'm standing on the edge of some crazy cliff. What I have to do, I have to catch everybody if they start to go over the cliff – I mean if they're running and they don't look where they're going I have to come out from somewhere and catch them. That's all I do all day. I'd just be the catcher in the rye and all.

The judge ordered psychiatric treatment for Chapman during his incarceration and sentenced him to 20 years to life, five years less than the maximum sentence of 25 years to life.

== Imprisonment ==
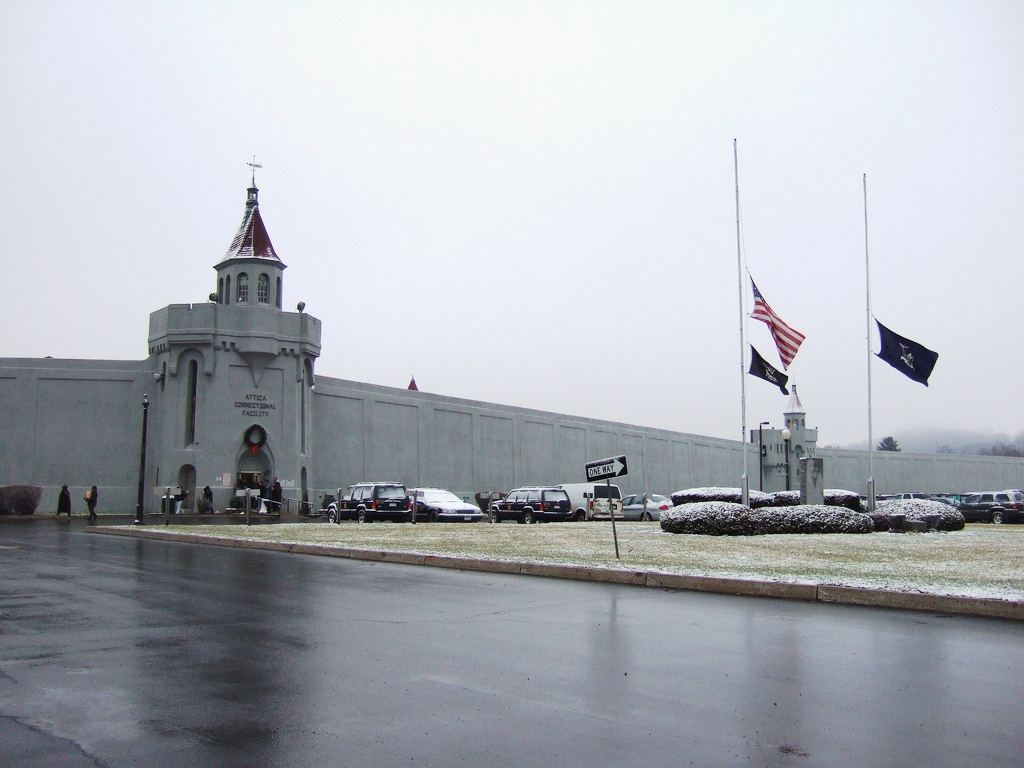
Attica Correctional Facility in Attica, New York, where Chapman was imprisoned from 1981 to 2012

In 1981, Chapman was imprisoned at Attica Correctional Facility outside Buffalo, New York. He fasted for twenty-six days in February 1982, so the New York State Supreme Court authorized the state to force-feed him. Central New York Psychiatric Center director Martin Von Holden said that Chapman refused to eat with other inmates but agreed to take liquid nutrients. He was held in a solitary confinement unit for violent and at-risk prisoners, in part due to concern that he might be harmed by Lennon's fans in the general population. There were 105 inmates in the facility who were "not considered a threat to him," according to the New York State Department of Correctional Services. He had his own cell but spent "most of his day outside his cell working on housekeeping and in the library."

Chapman worked in the prison as a legal clerk and kitchen helper. He was barred from participating in the Cephas Attica workshops, a charitable organization helping inmates adjust to life outside prison. He was also prohibited from attending the prison's violence and anger management classes due to concern for his safety. He told a parole board in 2000 what he would do if paroled: "I would immediately try to find a job, and I really want to go from place to place, at least in the state, church to church, and tell people what happened to me and point them the way to Christ." He also said that he thought that he could find work as a farmhand or return to his previous trade as a printer.

Chapman is in the Family Reunion Program, and has been allowed regular conjugal visits since 2014 with his wife since he accepted solitary confinement. The program allows him to spend 44 hours alone with his wife in a specially built prison home, a trailer on prison grounds equipped with a kitchen, bathroom, and a bedroom. He also gets occasional visits from his sister, clergy, and a few friends. In 2004, Department of Correctional Services spokesman James Flateau said that Chapman had been involved in three "minor incidents" between 1989 and 1994 which included delaying an inmate count and refusing to follow an order but overall is considered to be a model inmate. On May 15, 2012, he was transferred to the Wende Correctional Facility in Alden, New York, which is east of Buffalo. On March 30, 2022, he was transferred to the Green Haven Correctional Facility in Beekman, New York, which is in Dutchess County.

== Book, interviews, and media appearances ==
Chapman claimed he had declined all offers for interviews following the murder and during his first six years at Attica, later claiming that he did not want to give the impression that he killed Lennon as a route to acquire fame and notoriety. Despite his claim that he refused all interviews during those six years, James R. Gaines interviewed him and wrote a three-part, 18,000-word People magazine series starting in 1981 and climaxing in February and March 1987. Chapman subsequently told the parole board that he regretted the interview. He gave a series of audio-taped interviews to Jack Jones of the Rochester Democrat and Chronicle, and Jones published Let Me Take You Down: Inside the Mind of Mark David Chapman, the Man Who Killed John Lennon in 1992. Jones asked Chapman to tell his story for Mugshots, a CourtTV program in 2000, with his first parole hearing approaching. Chapman refused to go on camera but consented to tell his story in a series of audiotapes.

On December 4, 1992, ABC's 20/20 aired an interview with Barbara Walters, Chapman's first television interview. On December 17, 1992, Larry King interviewed Chapman on his CNN program Larry King Live.

== Parole applications, campaigns, and denials ==
Chapman first became eligible for parole in 2000 after serving twenty years in prison. Under New York state law, he is required to have a parole hearing every two years from that year onward. Since that time, a two- or three-member board has denied Chapman parole 14 times. Before his first parole hearing, Yoko Ono sent a letter to the board requesting that Chapman should stay behind bars and serve out the remainder of his life sentence. In addition, New York State Senator Michael Nozzolio, chairman of the Senate Crime Victims, Crime and Correction Committee, wrote to Parole Board Chairman Brion Travis saying: "It is the responsibility of the New York State Parole Board to ensure that public safety is protected from the release of dangerous criminals like Mark David Chapman."

Chapman is eligible for parole in February 2027.

=== Timeline ===
Year	Hearing	Date	Decision	Board rationale / notes
2000	1st	October 3	Denied	At a 50-minute hearing, Chapman said he was not a threat to society and argued that Lennon would have approved of his release. The board denied parole, stating that release would deprecate the seriousness of the crime and undermine respect for the law. It also cited Chapman's media interviews as evidence of a continued interest in notoriety. Although he had a good disciplinary record, the board noted that he had been in solitary confinement and had not participated in anti-violence or anti-aggression programming.
2002	2nd	October 8	Denied	Despite a positive behavioral record, the board again stated that releasing Chapman after 22 years in prison would deprecate the seriousness of the crime.
2004	3rd	October 4	Denied	The board cited the suffering imposed on Yoko Ono, who had witnessed the shooting, and also raised concerns about Chapman's safety if released because of threats from Lennon fans. By this time, about 6,000 people had signed an online petition opposing his release.
2006	4th	October 11	Denied	After a 16-minute hearing, the board concluded that release would not be in the best interest of the community or Chapman's own safety.
2008	5th	August 12	Denied	Chapman was denied parole because of concerns for public safety and welfare.
2010	6th	September 7	Denied	Before the hearing, Ono again opposed Chapman's release, citing safety concerns for herself, Lennon's sons, and Chapman. The hearing was briefly postponed while the board awaited additional information for his record. On September 7, the board denied parole, stating that release remained inappropriate and incompatible with the welfare of the community.
2012	7th	August 23	Denied	The board stated that release would undermine respect for the law and trivialize the loss of life caused by what it described as a heinous, unprovoked, violent, cold, and calculated crime.
2014	8th	August 28	Denied	Chapman told the board that he was sorry for seeking glory through the killing and said he had found peace in Christianity. The board concluded that there was a reasonable probability that he would not remain at liberty without again violating the law.
2016	9th	August 29	Denied	Chapman said he now regarded the killing as premeditated, selfish, and evil. The board again denied parole.
2018	10th	August 29	Denied	The board found Chapman to be at low risk to reoffend, but emphasized that he had carefully planned and carried out the murder of a world-famous person in order to gain notoriety. It also cited the pain caused to Lennon's family, friends, and the public, as well as Chapman's disregard for human life.
2020	11th	August 27	Denied	Chapman was denied parole for the eleventh time. Officials said that release would be incompatible with the welfare of society. According to tapes later obtained by ABC News, Chapman said he had sought glory by killing a member of the Beatles.
2022	12th	November 8	Denied	Chapman said he knew the murder was wrong but wanted fame and wanted to become "somebody". The board denied parole, citing what it described as his selfish disregard for human life of global consequence and the continuing international impact of the crime.
2024	13th	March 15	Denied	Chapman appeared before the parole board in early March and was again denied parole.
2025	14th	August 27	Denied	Parole denied following hearing; officials confirmed the decision but the hearing transcript was not immediately released.

== In film ==
Two films center on Chapman and the murder: The Killing of John Lennon (2006), starring Jonas Ball as Chapman, focuses on Chapman's life up to the murder. Chapter 27 (2007), starring Jared Leto as Chapman, based on Jack Jones's book Let Me Take You Down, attempts a nonjudgmental portrayal of Chapman.

== See also ==
- Michael Abram, man who stabbed and attempted to murder another Beatles member George Harrison in 1999.
- Yolanda Saldívar, President of the fan club and manager of boutiques for American singer Selena who murdered her in 1995.
- Ricardo López, man who stalked and attempted to murder Icelandic singer Björk before shooting and killing himself on camera in 1996.
- Robert John Bardo, man who stalked and murdered American actress Rebecca Schaeffer in 1989.
- Nathan Gale, man who shot and killed American guitarist Dimebag Darrell as well as three others in 2004.
- John Hinckley Jr., man who stalked American actress Jodie Foster and shot U.S. President Ronald Reagan in an attempt to impress her.
