= Power to the People: The Hits =

Power To The People: The Hits

Greatest hits album by John Lennon
- Released: 5 October 2010
- Recorded: 1969–1980
- Genre: Rock
- Length: 57:46
- Label: Capitol Records
- Producers: Yoko Ono, Capitol Records

John Lennon chronology
Gimme Some Truth (2010)	Power To The People: The Hits (2010)	John Lennon Signature Box (2010)

Alternative cover
- Experience Edition (CD/DVD)

Professional ratings
Review scores
Source	Rating
AllMusic	4/5 stars
BBC	(favourable)
Mojo	4/5 stars
Uncut	4/5 stars

Power to the People: The Hits is a compilation album gathering John Lennon's most popular songs, as part of the Gimme Some Truth box set. It is available as a standard 15-track disc and download package, and as an expanded "Experience Edition" with a 15-track DVD.

== Background ==
This album is a compilation produced to commemorate the 70th anniversary of John Lennon's birth and it became his fifth greatest hits album following Shaved Fish, The John Lennon Collection, Lennon Legend: The Very Best of John Lennon, and Working Class Hero: The Definitive Lennon.

The CD includes 14 single releases that appeared between 1969 and 1981 as well as tracks from the albums Gimme Some Truth and Imagine. With the exception of "Nobody Told Me" the CD contains all of Lennon's songs that reached the top 20 on both the UK and US charts. Yoko Ono is briefly credited as a producer however since individual producers are listed in the liner notes for each track this credit is generally understood to apply only to the compilation itself.

The album was released in two formats a standard CD edition and a deluxe edition that includes a DVD featuring the promotional videos for all tracks included on the album. The deluxe edition also contains an access card for an online universe limited to 20,000 copies.

== Track listing ==
All tracks are written by John Lennon, except where noted.

No.	Title	Writer(s)	Originally released	Length
1.	"Power to the People"		March 1971 as a single	3:23
2.	"Gimme Some Truth"		September 1971 on the album Imagine	3:14
3.	"Woman"		November 1980 on the album Double Fantasy	3:32
4.	"Instant Karma! (We All Shine On)"		February 1970 as a single	3:21
5.	"Whatever Gets You thru the Night"		October 1974 on the album Walls and Bridges	3:27
6.	"Cold Turkey (Live)"		October 1969 as a single - although it is stated as the live version, this collection contains the studio single version.	5:04
7.	"Jealous Guy"		September 1971 on the album Imagine	4:15
8.	"#9 Dream"		October 1974 on the album Walls and Bridges	4:49
9.	"(Just Like) Starting Over"		November 1980 on the album Double Fantasy	4:00
10.	"Mind Games"		November 1973 on the album Mind Games	4:13
11.	"Watching the Wheels"		November 1980 on the album Double Fantasy	3:32
12.	"Stand by Me"	Ben E. King, Jerry Leiber, Mike Stoller	February 1975 on the album Rock 'n' Roll	3:33
13.	"Imagine"	Lennon, Yoko Ono	October 1971 on the album Imagine	3:04
14.	"Happy Xmas (War Is Over)"	Ono, Lennon	December 1971 as a single	3:34
15.	"Give Peace a Chance"		July 1969 as a single	4:53
Total length:				57:10

== Charts ==
=== Weekly charts ===
Chart (2010)	Peak position
Australian Albums (ARIA)	10
Austrian Albums (Ö3 Austria)	16
Belgian Albums (Ultratop Flanders)	27
Belgian Albums (Ultratop Wallonia)	16
Canadian Albums (Billboard)	7
Croatian International Albums (HDU)	15
Danish Albums (Hitlisten)	8
Dutch Albums (Album Top 100)	64
German Albums (Offizielle Top 100)	33
Irish Albums (IRMA)	59
Italian Albums (FIMI)	16
Mexican Albums (Top 100 Mexico)	18
New Zealand Albums (RMNZ)	7
Portuguese Albums (AFP)	16
Spanish Albums (Promusicae)	21
Swedish Albums (Sverigetopplistan)	33
Swiss Albums (Schweizer Hitparade)	25
UK Albums (Official Charts)	15
US Billboard 200	24
US Digital Albums (Billboard)	21
US Top Rock Albums (Billboard)	7
US Indie Store Album Sales (Billboard)	17

=== Year-end charts ===
Chart (2019)	Position
US Top Rock Albums (Billboard)	91
Chart (2020)	Position
US Top Rock Albums (Billboard)	90

== Certifications ==
Region	Certification	Certified units/sales
Denmark (IFPI Danmark)	Gold	10,000^{‡}
Italy (FIMI)	Gold	25,000^{*}
United Kingdom (BPI)	Silver	60,000^{‡}
^{*} Sales figures based on certification alone.^{‡} Sales+streaming figures based on certification alone.
