= Lennon Legend: The Very Best of John Lennon =

Greatest hits album by John Lennon
- Released: 27 October 1997
- Recorded: June 1969 – Late 1980
- Genre: Rock
- Length: 77:39
- Label: Parlophone
- Producers: John Lennon, Yoko Ono, Phil Spector, Jack Douglas

John Lennon chronology
Lennon (1990)	Lennon Legend: The Very Best of John Lennon (1997)	John Lennon Anthology (1998)

Professional ratings
Review scores
Source	Rating
AllMusic	4.5/5 stars
MusicHound	4/5 stars
NME	4/10 stars
The Rolling Stone Album Guide	4.5/5 stars
Uncut	3/5 stars

Lennon Legend: The Very Best of John Lennon is the third official compilation album of John Lennon's solo career, coming after 1975's Shaved Fish and 1982's The John Lennon Collection. Because neither collection spanned Lennon's releases up to and including 1984's Milk and Honey, Lennon Legend: The Very Best of John Lennon – considered the definitive Lennon retrospective – was compiled. It was released in the UK in 1997 on EMI's Parlophone and early 1998 in the US.

Lennon Legend: The Very Best of John Lennon peaked at number 4 on the UK Albums Chart and certified 2× Platinum by the BPI in May 1998. The album has also certified Platinum in the US and Canada as of December 2008. In the history of Japanese Oricon chart, Lennon Legend has been one of the longest charting albums that failed to reach top 40, selling more than 190,000 copies up to late 2006.

The album re-entered the UK Chart on 18 June 2007, almost ten years after its release, at number 30. The album also appeared in a commercial for Apple's iPod Touch. A DVD with the same name was also released in 2003 as a series of remastered, remixed & new music videos with Dolby Digital 5.1 Surround Sound audio mixes. A limited edition, with both the CD and the DVD was also released in Europe in 2007.

== Track listing ==
All songs written and composed by John Lennon, except where noted.

1. "Imagine" – 3:02
2. "Instant Karma!" – 3:20
3. "Mother" (US Single edit) – 3:53
4. "Jealous Guy" – 4:14
5. "Power to the People" – 3:17
6. "Cold Turkey" – 5:01
7. "Love" – 3:23
8. "Mind Games" – 4:11
9. "Whatever Gets You Thru the Night" – 3:19
10. "#9 Dream" – 4:46
11. "Stand By Me" (Ben E. King, Jerry Leiber, Mike Stoller) – 3:27
12. "(Just Like) Starting Over" – 3:55
13. "Woman" – 3:26
14. "Beautiful Boy (Darling Boy)" – 4:00
15. "Watching the Wheels" – 3:31
16. "Nobody Told Me" – 3:33
17. "Borrowed Time" – 4:30
18. "Working Class Hero" – 3:49
19. "Happy Xmas (War Is Over)" (Yoko Ono, John Lennon) – 3:33
20. "Give Peace a Chance" – 4:52

== Charts and certifications ==
=== Charts ===
Chart (1997)	Position
Australian Albums Chart	37
Austrian Albums Chart	5
Belgian Albums Chart(Flanders)	94
Belgian Albums Chart(Wallonia)	48
Canadian RPM Albums Chart	86
Dutch Albums Chart	85
Finnish Albums Chart	22
French SNEP Compipation Albums Chart	7
German Albums Chart	11
Japanese Oricon Albums Chart	46
Mexican Albums Chart	62
New Zealand Albums Chart	21
Norwegian VG-lista Albums Chart	39
Swedish Albums Chart	28
Swiss Albums Chart	13
UK Albums Chart	4
US Billboard 200	65
US Catalog Albums	8

=== Year-end charts ===
Chart (1998)	Position
German Albums Chart	80

=== Certifications ===
Region	Certification	Certified units/sales
Argentina (CAPIF)	Gold	30,000^{^}
Australia (ARIA)	4× Platinum	280,000^{^}
Austria (IFPI Austria)	Gold	25,000^{*}
Canada (Music Canada)	Platinum	100,000^{^}
Germany (BVMI)	Gold	250,000^{‡}
Japan (RIAJ)	Gold	192,300
Spain (Promusicae)	Platinum	100,000^{^}
Switzerland (IFPI Switzerland)	Gold	25,000^{^}
United Kingdom (BPI)	3× Platinum	900,000^{*}
United States (RIAA)	Platinum	1,875,000
Summaries
Europe (IFPI)	Platinum	1,000,000^{*}
^{*} Sales figures based on certification alone.^{^} Shipments figures based on certification alone.^{‡} Sales+streaming figures based on certification alone.
