= Lennon Legend: The Very Best of John Lennon (video) =

Video by John Lennon
- Released: November 2003
- Recorded: 1969–1980
- Genres: Rock, pop
- Length: 100 minutes
- Label: Parlophone
- Directors: Simon Hilton, John Lennon, Yoko Ono, Joe Pytka, Bruce Westcott
- Producers: James Chads, Yoko Ono

John Lennon chronology
| The John Lennon Video Collection (1992) | Lennon Legend: The Very Best of John Lennon (2003) | Classic Albums: John Lennon/Plastic Ono Band (2008) |

Lennon Legend: The Very Best of John Lennon is a DVD that was released in November 2003, as a companion to the 1997 album of the same name. It features a series of remastered, remixed, and new videos with Dolby Digital 5.1 Surround Sound audio mixes. It was available by itself, and in a 2-disc set with the CD.

== Content ==
The DVD featured never-before-seen footage from the Lennon/Ono archive, rare newsreel and private footage, 15 new and newly remastered music videos, 5.1 surround sound, new animations of Lennon's drawings and an extensive photo gallery including rare and previously unseen images.

Featuring 20 tracks in total, the DVD featured footage that was traced back as close to its original source as possible. In many cases this meant going back to the original film negative, which was then digitally re-transferred and remastered. With footage shot on video, it was necessary to go back to John Lennon's original camera tapes (all on long-obsolete formats) and have them re-transferred.

This has been a source of contempt for Lennon fans, as the wide majority of videos on the DVD were newly made, with the exceptions of "Imagine", "Instant Karma!", and "Woman." Both "Power to the People" and "Whatever Gets You Thru the Night" are the originals, albeit in extended form, and the video for "Stand by Me" has new footage inserted. The originals can be found on the 1992 VHS compilation The John Lennon Video Collection, which as of this writing has not been re-released.

This is as definitive a collection as it's possible to be. John's life was an amazing one and one that I feel privileged to have been part of. Compiling this DVD has been a very emotional experience: unearthing rare footage, watching it increase in clarity before my eyes, reliving hundreds of memories that were part of our lives and which are now being passed on to a new generation. It is a film made with love and hope – my love for my husband and our hope that peace will prevail in the world. Give peace a chance!

— Yoko Ono

Yoko was very keen that the DVD's film and video content should be of the highest possible quality, to accompany the stunning new audio remasters. We explored all the archives around the world – from EMI and Abbey Road to New York, all the possible stock footage and newsreel sources, plus several attics and basements too, blowing dust off old film-cans, rubbing them and watching the genie appear. As we turned the archives upside down and inside out, we also uncovered all sorts of hidden gems, included here and within the 'extra features' section of the DVD.

— Director Simon Hilton

== DVD Video listing ==
All track notes taken from the DVD booklet.

1. "Imagine"
  - A brand new transfer, taken from a first-generation 35mm inter-negative of the original 16mm Imagine film negative. Restored and remastered for the very first time in a stunning new digital transfer. Directed by John & Yoko, this was originally filmed on 22 July 1971, and is now seen with its full original intro sequence.
2. "Instant Karma!"
  - John & The Plastic Ono Band, filmed for BBC 1's "Top of the Pops" on 11 February 1970.
  - This version has never before been commercially released. It is a longer audio version than the original single version, containing extra choruses at the end.
3. "Mother"
  - A brand new video featuring a journey through emotive stills from John's life. This is the full album version of the song; the CD compilation contains only the single edit.
4. "Jealous Guy"
  - A new video taken from footage of John recording "Jealous Guy" in the studio at Tittenhurst Park Studios in June 1971, and the "Jealous Guy" driving and rowing sequences (filmed on 21 July 1971) used in John & Yoko's "Imagine" film.
5. "Power to the People"
  - An extended version of John & Yoko's original video, including John & Yoko on the Oz march protests on 11 August 1971.
6. "Cold Turkey"
  - A new video, taken from 16mm film performance footage of John & 'The Plastic Ono Elephant's Memory Band' live onstage in New York in Madison Square Garden on 30 August 1972, and John & Yoko leaving Marylebone Magistrates' Court in London after his November 1968 cannabis conviction. It also features an excerpt from John's short film "Freedom".
7. "Love"
  - A new video, featuring footage of John and Yoko from 26 November 1980 at the Sperone Gallery in New York and from the beach at South Beach, Staten Island, New York in 1971.
8. "Mind Games"
  - A new video. On 15 November 1974 a BBC film crew, directed by John, spent a day with him around Central Park and various other locations in New York, to make a video for "Whatever Gets You Through The Night". The video was never broadcast, but a small amount of the footage emerged as a very short edit for “#9 Dream" in February 1975. We unearthed all the original camera film reels from the day, which were very aged and damaged from decay and scratching, cleaned them up, and discovered incredibly charismatic footage of John, obviously greatly enjoying himself on a sunny day out.
9. "Whatever Gets You Thru the Night"
  - A restored and extended version of the original John Kanemaker animation video, based on John's drawings and sketches.
10. "#9 Dream"
  - A new video, made from the films "Smile" and "Two Virgins" (August 1968) and footage shot for the "Imagine" film in 1971.
11. "Stand By Me"
  - A new video, featuring John's performance, filmed at The Hit Factory in New York on 18 March 1975 (subsequently licensed to the BBC's "Old Grey Whistle Test"), and footage of John & Yoko together, most of it previously unseen.
  - This is a longer version of the original album version, with the end fade-out removed.
12. "(Just Like) Starting Over"
  - A new video, by legendary director Joe Pytka (who made The Beatles' "Free As A Bird" video), made in 2000.
13. "Woman"
  - A restored version of Yoko's original video from January 1981, featuring a brand new digital transfer of footage of John and Yoko walking in Central Park on 26 November 1980.
14. "Beautiful Boy (Darling Boy)"
  - A new video capturing the feeling of a relaxed day at John & Yoko's mansion in Coldspring Harbour, Long Island, filmed on 20 April 1980.
15. "Watching the Wheels"
  - A new video, featuring unique home movie holiday footage of John and Sean in the Cayman Islands, Florida, Japan and New York, much previously unseen.
16. "Nobody Told Me"
  - A new video, edited from newly transferred footage and out-takes from John & Yoko's "Imagine" film and other previously unseen footage. It also features George Harrison, Dick Cavett, and Fred Astaire.
  - This version is longer than the original album version.
17. "Borrowed Time"
  - A new video, edited from a wide variety of never-before-seen excerpts and out-takes from deep within the Lennon film archives from 1968–1980."
  - This is a slightly longer version than the album version.
18. "Working Class Hero"
  - A new video, directed by Simon Hilton, filmed in Liverpool. at John's childhood school, Dovedale Primary, at Strawberry Fields, and John's childhood home, Mendips, recently acquired by Yoko and donated to the National Trust.
19. "Happy Xmas (War Is Over)"
  - War is over if you want it. A new video that speaks for itself.
20. "Give Peace a Chance"
  - A new video, featuring the original "Bed-In" recording of "GPAC" from May 1969, plus additional protest footage from the era, including John & Yoko appearing at the National Peace Rally in Bryant Park, New York on 22 April 1972. It concludes with the hundreds of thousands who gathered in Liverpool, London and New York for vigils on 14 December 1980, singing "GPAC".

== Extra features ==
1. "Working Class Hero (Anthology Version)"
  - A video made for the "Anthology" version of "WCH" that acts as a short documentary of John's life, narrated by him.
2. "Slippin' & Slidin'"
  - John's performance was filmed at The Hit Factory in New York on 18 March 1975 (subsequently licensed to the BBC's "Old Grey Whistle Test").
3. "Imagine (live)"
  - Filmed at the "Salute to Lew Grade" concert on 18 April 1975. This was John's last live performance.
4. "Hair Peace"
  - A little something we uncovered in the archives.
5. "Everybody Had a Hard Year"
  - An excerpt from John & Yoko's "Film #6" that features a never before released performance by John & Yoko from Dec 1968.
6. "Animations in the style of John Lennon's drawings"
  - Animations by Jamie Hewlett and Zombie Flesh Eaters of Gorillaz fame
7. "Imagine photo gallery"
  - Featuring rare/unseen images
  - Contains previously unreleased instrumental of "Imagine"

== Charts and certifications ==
=== Weekly charts ===
Chart performance for Lennon Legend: The Very Best of John Lennon
| Chart (2003–04) | Peak position |
|---|---|
| Australian Music DVD (ARIA) | 7 |
| Austrian Music DVD (Ö3 Austria) | 4 |
| Dutch Music DVD (MegaCharts) | 27 |
| Italian Music DVD (FIMI) | 2 |
| Japanese Music DVD (Oricon) | 11 |
| New Zealand Music DVD (RMNZ) | 3 |
| Swedish Music DVD (Sverigetopplistan) | 4 |
| UK Music Videos (Official Charts) | 2 |
| US Music Videos (Billboard) | 15 |

=== Certifications ===
Certifications for Lennon Legend: The Very Best of John Lennon
| Region | Certification | Certified units/sales |
|---|---|---|
| Argentina (CAPIF) | Platinum | 8,000^{^} |
| Australia (ARIA) | 2× Platinum | 30,000^{^} |
| Canada (Music Canada) | Platinum | 10,000^{^} |
| France (SNEP) | Gold | 10,000^{*} |
| Mexico (AMPROFON) | Platinum | 20,000^{^} |
| New Zealand (RMNZ) | 2× Platinum | 10,000^{^} |
| United Kingdom (BPI) | Platinum | 50,000^{^} |
| United States (RIAA) | Platinum | 100,000^{^} |
^{*} Sales figures based on certification alone.^{^} Shipments figures based on certification alone.
