= Instant Karma! =

- UK picture sleeve

Single by Lennon/Ono with the Plastic Ono Band
- B-side: "Who Has Seen the Wind?" (Yoko Ono)
- Released: 6 February 1970
- Recorded: 27 January 1970
- Studio: EMI, London
- Genre: Rock
- Length: 3:18
- Label: Apple
- Songwriter: John Lennon
- Producer: Phil Spector

John Lennon singles chronology
"Cold Turkey" (1969)	"Instant Karma!" (1970)	"Mother" (1970)

Alternative cover
- US picture sleeve

Top of the Pops appearance
- "Instant Karma!" on YouTube

"Instant Karma!" (also known as under the title "Instant Karma! (We All Shine On)") is a song by English musician John Lennon, released as a single on Apple Records in February 1970. The lyrics focus on a concept in which the consequences of one's actions are immediate rather than borne out over a lifetime. The single was credited to "Lennon/Ono with the Plastic Ono Band", apart from in the US, where the credit was "John Ono Lennon". The song reached the top five in the British and American charts, competing with the Beatles' "Let It Be" in the US, where it became the first solo single by a member of the band to sell a million copies.

"Instant Karma!" was conceived, written, recorded, and released within a period of ten days, making it one of the fastest-released songs in pop music history. The recording was produced by Phil Spector, marking a comeback for the American producer after his self-imposed retirement in 1966, and leading to him being offered the producer's role on the Beatles' Let It Be album. Recorded at London's EMI Studios (now Abbey Road Studios), "Instant Karma!" employs Spector's signature Wall of Sound technique and features contributions from George Harrison, Klaus Voormann, Alan White, and Billy Preston. The B-side was "Who Has Seen the Wind?", a song composed and performed by Ono. When released in the US, the single was given a minor remix by Spector.

Recently shorn of the long hair synonymous with their 1969 campaign for world peace, Lennon and Ono promoted the single with an appearance on Britain's Top of the Pops five days after its release. The song received positive reviews and is considered by some music critics to be among the finest recordings from Lennon's solo career. A live performance recorded at his and Ono's "One to One" concerts in August 1972 was included on the posthumously released Live in New York City (1986). Paul Weller, Duran Duran, and U2 are among the acts who have recorded or performed "Instant Karma!" Its chorus also inspired the title to Stephen King's 1977 novel The Shining.

== Background ==
Everybody was going on about karma ... but it occurred to me that karma is instant, as well as it influences your past life or your future life. There really is a reaction to what you do now ... Also, I'm fascinated by commercials and promotion as an art form ... So, the idea of instant karma was like the idea of instant coffee: presenting something in a new form.

— John Lennon to Playboy magazine, 1980

Together with his wife, Yoko Ono, John Lennon spent New Year 1970 in Aalborg, Denmark, establishing a relationship with Ono's former husband, artist Tony Cox, and visiting Cox's and Ono's daughter Kyoko. The visit coincided with the start of what Lennon termed "Year 1 AP (After Peace)", following his and Ono's heavily publicised Bed-Ins and other peace-campaign activities throughout 1969. To mark the new era, on 20 January 1970, the couple shaved off their shoulder-length hair – an act that Britain's Daily Mirror described as "the most sensational scalpings since the Red Indians went out of business." Having been recognised for his peace efforts in a segment on ITV's Man of the Decade documentary, and then chosen as Rolling Stone magazine's "Man of the Year" for 1969, Lennon said he cut his hair to "stop being hyped by revolutionary image and long hair." Lennon and Ono promised to auction the shorn hair for a charitable cause. This pledge followed the couple's announcement, on 5 January, that they would donate all future royalties from their recordings to the peace movement.

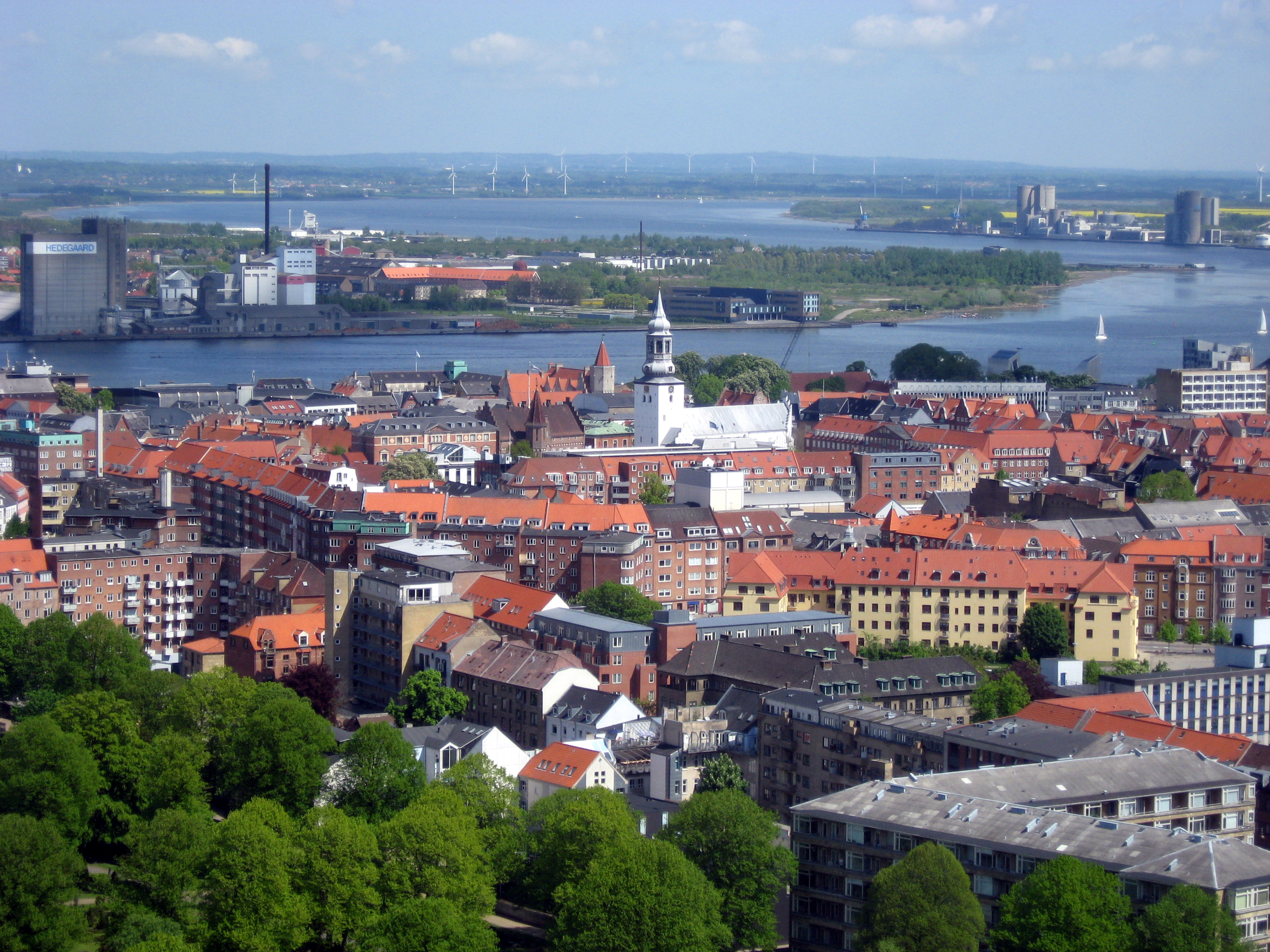
Lennon was inspired to write the song by conversations he had when visiting the Danish city of Aalborg in January 1970.

While in Denmark, the Lennons, Cox, and Cox's current partner, Melinde Kendall, discussed the concept of "instant karma", whereby the causality of one's actions is immediate rather than borne out over a lifetime. Author Philip Norman writes of the concept's appeal: "The idea was quintessential Lennon – the age-old Buddhist law of cause and effect turned into something as modern and synthetic as instant coffee and, simultaneously, into a bogey under the stairs that can get you if you don't watch out." On 27 January, two days after returning to the UK, Lennon woke up with the beginnings of a song inspired by his conversations with Cox and Kendall. Working at home on a piano, he developed the idea and came up with a melody for the composition, which he titled "Instant Karma!"

Lennon completed the writing of "Instant Karma!" in an hour. Eager to record the song immediately, he then telephoned his Beatles bandmate George Harrison and American producer Phil Spector, who was in London at the invitation of Allen Klein, the manager of the Beatles' Apple Corps organisation. According to Lennon's recollection, he told Spector: "Come over to Apple quick, I've just written a monster."

== Writing ==
The song employs a descending three-note melodic progression similar to "Three Blind Mice" and an intro reminiscent of "Some Other Guy". Lennon had used a similar-sounding chord progression in the Beatles' 1967 single "All You Need Is Love". (Note: When its similarity to "All You Need Is Love" was pointed out to Lennon by a BBC Radio 1 listener, shortly after the release of "Instant Karma!", Lennon acknowledged that he had been playing the chords from the 1967 song when writing the melody. In a subsequent interview on the New York radio station WPLJ, Lennon said he had "stole[n] the introduction" from "Some Other Guy".) Later in 1970, he would adopt the melody of "Three Blind Mice", an English nursery rhyme, for his song "My Mummy's Dead".

In their book The Words and Music of John Lennon, Ben Urish and Kenneth Bielen write that in the first verse of "Instant Karma!", Lennon employs sarcasm as he urges the listener to "Get yourself together / Pretty soon you're gonna be dead" and emphasises "It's up to you – yeah, you!" Norman comments on the "hippie catchphrase of the moment" contained in this instruction to "Get yourself together", and he says that the warning of imminent death is "obviously not to be taken literally." Author Mark Hertsgaard cites the lines "Why in the world are we here? / Surely not to live in pain and fear" as a further example of Lennon "asking what purpose his life on earth was to serve," after his 1966 composition "Strawberry Fields Forever". According to Urish and Bielen, "Instant Karma!" conveys the need to recognise and act upon a shared responsibility for the wellbeing of humankind; the karmic rewards of this mindset are available to all, as implied in Lennon's exhortation to "Come and get your share". The same authors pair the song with Lennon's and Ono's "Happy Xmas (War Is Over)" single from 1971, in terms of how the song "both prods and challenges listeners before providing reassurance."

As with "Give Peace a Chance" and "Power to the People" – Lennon singles from 1969 and 1971 – the chorus has an anthem-like quality, as he sings: "We all shine on, like the moon and the stars and the sun." Norman describes the chorus as Lennon restating his message of "peace campaigning and non-violent, optimistic togetherness." According to Lennon biographer John Blaney, the song is an appeal "for mankind to take responsibility for its fate" and represents "Lennon developing his own brand of egalitarianism."

== Recording ==
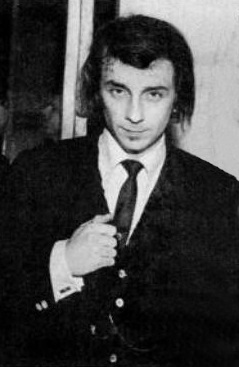
Phil Spector made his first contribution as a Beatles producer with Lennon's "Instant Karma!"

Although still officially a member of the Beatles, Lennon had privately announced his departure from the band in September 1969. He was keen to issue "Instant Karma!" immediately as a single, the third under his and Ono's Plastic Ono Band moniker. (Note: While the Beatles had been inactive as a group over the ensuing months, Harrison, Paul McCartney, and Ringo Starr came together for the last time in January 1970 to record "I Me Mine" and complete "Let It Be", for their inclusion on the soundtrack album accompanying the Let It Be documentary film. During his stay in Aalborg, Lennon kept in touch with Harrison by telephone but he did not return to London for these sessions.) The recording session took place at EMI Studios (now Abbey Road Studios) in north-west London, on the evening of 27 January. Lennon's fellow musicians at the session were Harrison, Klaus Voormann, Alan White, and Billy Preston – all of whom had performed at the December 1969 Peace for Christmas Concert, as part of the Plastic Ono Supergroup. The recording engineer for "Instant Karma!" was EMI mainstay Phil McDonald. Spector produced the session, arriving late after Harrison had found him at Apple's office and persuaded him to attend.

According to author Bruce Spizer, the line-up for the basic track, before overdubs, was Lennon (vocals, acoustic guitar), Harrison (electric guitar), Preston (organ), Voormann (bass), and White (drums). (Note: In Harrison's recollection, however, Preston was not present at this point. He also says that Lennon played piano rather than guitar.) Lennon later recalled of the recording: "Phil (Spector) came in and said, 'How do you want it?' And I said, '1950s' and he said 'Right' and BOOM! ... he played it back and there it was." The song uses a similar amount of echo to 1950s Sun Records recordings.

[T]here was this little guy walking around with "PS" on his shirt, and I was thinking, "Who is this guy?" … When he turned on the playback [after recording], it was just incredible. First, it was ridiculously loud, but also there was the ring of all these instruments and the way the song had such motion. As a first experience of the difference from the way you played it to the sound in the control room, it was overwhelming. And I knew immediately who he was – Phil Spector.

— Klaus Voormann, describing his first experience of working with Spector and his Wall of Sound technique

The musicians recorded ten takes, the last of which was selected for overdubbing. To create what Spector biographer Mark Ribowsky terms a "four-man Wall of Sound" production, Lennon added grand piano onto the basic track, while Harrison and White shared another piano and Voormann played electric piano. (Note: Although authors such as Richard Williams, Mick Brown, Mark Lewisohn, and Ribowsky state that Lennon played piano, some sources give electric piano as his keyboard instrument on the song.) In addition, Beatles aide Mal Evans overdubbed chimes (or tubular bells) and White added a second, muffled drum part. Rather than an instrumental solo over the third verse, Lennon vocalised a series of what Urish and Bielen term "grunts and moans". Lennon felt that the chorus was missing something, and so Preston and Evans were sent to a nearby nightclub to bring in a group of people to provide backing vocals. These newcomers and all the musicians, along with Allen Klein, then added chorus vocals, with Harrison directing the singing.

Although Lennon and Spector disagreed over the bass sound, Lennon was delighted with the producer's work on "Instant Karma!" White's drums assumed the role of a lead instrument, positioned prominently in the mix. Spector biographer Richard Williams wrote in 1972: "No Beatles record had ever possessed such a unique sound; Spector had used echo to make the drums reverberate like someone slapping a wet fish on a marble slab, and the voices sounded hollow and decayed." Spector wanted to add a string section to the track in Los Angeles, but Lennon insisted that the recording was complete.

Having only recently returned to producing, after the commercial failure of Ike & Tina Turner's 1966 single "River Deep – Mountain High" in America, Spector had "passed the audition", according to Beatles Forever author Nicholas Schaffner. "Instant Karma!" was the first of many Beatles-related recordings that Spector worked on during the early 1970s. Lennon and Harrison were sufficiently impressed with his production on the song that they asked Spector to work on the tapes for the Beatles' final album release, Let It Be, and then to produce their respective 1970 solo albums, John Lennon/Plastic Ono Band and All Things Must Pass. (Note: Lennon and Harrison had long been admirers of Spector's work in the 1960s, with the Ronettes and other vocal groups. Lennon later said that the Beatles had discussed using Spector before 1970 as an alternative to their usual producer, George Martin.)

== Release ==
"Instant Karma!" ranks as one of the fastest-released songs in pop music history, arriving in UK record stores just ten days after it was written. Apple Records' tagline in trade advertisements for the single read: "Ritten, Recorded, Remixed 27th Jan 1970." Lennon remarked to the press that he "wrote it for breakfast, recorded it for lunch, and we're putting it out for dinner." Apple issued the single on 6 February 1970 in Britain – credited to the Plastic Ono Band – and on 20 February in America, where the A-side was retitled "Instant Karma! (We All Shine On)" and credited to John Ono Lennon. (Note: The single's catalogue number was Apple 1003 in the UK and Apple 1818 in America.) Spector remixed "Instant Karma!" for the US release without Lennon's knowledge. Continuing the approach of the Plastic Ono Band's previous singles, "Give Peace a Chance" and "Cold Turkey", the B-side was an Ono composition, in this case "Who Has Seen the Wind?"

As with "Cold Turkey", the single's standard Apple Records A-side face label carried the words "PLAY LOUD", in both the UK and America. Reflecting the tender sound of "Who Has Seen the Wind?", the B-side label read "PLAY QUIET" (or "PLAY SOFT" in the US). The front of the US picture sleeve featured a black-and-white photo of Lennon along with a prominent producer's credit for Spector, while the reverse had a similar picture of Ono.

=== Promotion ===
Following a year of highly publicised peace campaigning by the Lennons in 1969, Apple press officer Derek Taylor was concerned that they had exhausted the media's interest in their causes. On 4 February 1970, Lennon and Ono staged a publicity stunt at the Black Centre in north London, where they donated a large plastic bag full of their hair, along with Apple's poster for the new single, to black power activist Michael X, in return for a pair of Muhammad Ali's bloodstained boxing shorts. The "final proof" of the Lennons' "overexpose[ure]", according to Taylor, was that there was a large press turnout for the event, yet "nobody printed anything." (Note: Author Jon Wiener also writes of the media's lack of interest in the couple by the end of 1969. He quotes Apple executive Peter Brown's assertion that Lennon's new adopted cause "destroyed his last shred of credibility with the press.")

On 11 February, Lennon and Ono filmed an appearance on BBC Television's Top of the Pops to promote "Instant Karma!", accompanied by White, Voormann, Evans, and BP Fallon. While the other musicians mimed their contributions, Lennon sang a live vocal over a mix of the song's instrumental track, prepared by EMI engineer Geoff Emerick. It was the first appearance on the program by any member of the Beatles since 1966, as well as the public unveiling of the Lennons' new cropped look. Two versions of "Instant Karma!" – known as "knitting" and "cue card" – were taped for Top of the Pops, and aired on 12 and 19 February, respectively.

Lennon and Ono (wearing a white blindfold) performing the song on Top of the Pops in February 1970

The clips differ in terms of Lennon's attire and the nature of Ono's role as, in author Robert Rodriguez's description, "an onstage focal point around which all activity was staged." (Note: As with the press conference with Michael X, the Lennons' rehearsals and performances for Tops of the Pops were simultaneously filmed by Tony Cox for a possible documentary film on the couple.) In addition, for the 19 February broadcast, Lennon's vocal was treated with echo. In the "knitting" clip, Lennon is wearing a black polo-neck jumper as Ono sits beside his piano, blindfolded, and knitting throughout. In "cue card", Lennon wears a flower-pattern shirt under a denim jacket, while Ono, seated on a stool, holds up a series of cryptically worded cue cards and speaks into her microphone. The cards' messages include "Smile", "Hope", and "Peace". Although Ono appears to have a more active role, she is again blindfolded and the words she utters cannot be heard. (Note: According to Kate Greer, an associate producer of Top of the Pops at the time, Ono used a sanitary towel for her blindfold.)

Lennon and Ono also promoted the single with an appearance on Emperor Rosko's BBC Radio 1 show Midday Spin, shortly after the "cue card" clip aired. In response to the many letters asking about her role in the Top of the Pops performance, Ono said "the blindfold means to me like everybody in the world is like blind ... the stool was like a grove ... And everybody's sitting on the grove blindfolded and trying their best, you know." Rodriguez describes both clips as "terrifically engaging, providing suitably dynamic visuals to a powerful song." He says that the "cue card" performance "captures much more of the ambience, with frequent shots of White's stellar work and the studio dancers." In the view of media analyst Michael Frontani, Lennon's and Ono's untidy, cropped hairstyle befitted the couple's "new agenda" for 1970 – a year in which Lennon, still mistrusted by the political left for his rejection of their principles in the Beatles' 1968 single "Revolution", sought "greater confrontation with the system." Frontani writes of Lennon's appearance on Top of the Pops, that it "was a stark picture, one at odds with his Beatles past. For Lennon, ragged and ugly in comparison to the Beatle image, it was a means of breaking even more fully with his pop star past."

=== Commercial success and aftermath ===
"Instant Karma!" was commercially successful, peaking at number 3 on America's Billboard Hot 100 chart, number 2 in Canada, and number 5 on the UK Singles Chart. (Note: On the US listings compiled by Cash Box and Record World magazines, it also peaked at number 3, while Britain's Melody Maker chart recorded the song at number 4.) The single also reached the top ten in several other European countries and in Australia. The release took place two months before Paul McCartney announced the break-up of the Beatles, whose penultimate single, the George Martin-produced "Let It Be", Lennon's record competed with on the US chart. "Instant Karma!" went on to become the first single by a solo Beatle to achieve US sales of 1 million, earning gold certification by the Recording Industry Association of America on 14 December 1970. (Note: The award came on the same day that Harrison's debut single, "My Sweet Lord", was certified gold by the RIAA, yet that song's US release took place nine months after "Instant Karma!") Until Lennon's death in December 1980, "Instant Karma!" remained his sole RIAA-certified gold single.

Despite the stated intentions for Lennon's and Ono's Year 1 AP, the proceeds from the auctioning of their hair benefited Michael X's Black House commune rather than the peace movement; according to Beatles Diary author Barry Miles, the pledge to donate their royalties was also "discreetly forgotten." In March 1970, Lennon publicly split with the organisers of the planned Toronto Peace Festival, as he and Ono began treatment under Arthur Janov's Primal Therapy. (Note: In author John Winn's description of the 4 February exchange of the Lennons' hair for Ali's shorts: "The plan was for Michael to auction off the hair to raise money for the Black Centre, a headquarters for various black power endeavors. John and Yoko would then auction off the trunks to raise money for their peace festival.") Before heading to California in April for intensive therapy through the summer, Lennon accused McCartney of using the Beatles' break-up to sell his album McCartney, and admitted that he wished that he himself had announced the break-up months before to promote his own solo release.

== Critical reception ==
On release, Chris Welch of Melody Maker declared: "Instant hit! John Lennon is singing better than ever. With a beautiful rock 'n' roll echo chamber on his mean but meaningful vocals and some superb drumming, it makes up the Plastics' best piece of boogie yet." Record World listed the song first on its three "Single Picks of the Week" predictions, saying: "John Ono Lennon is now produced by Phil Spector. 'Instant Karma' ... is gonna get YOU." Cash Box predicted the same success, saying: "'Instant Karma' has made it to New York, full reverb blaring and Lennon's guts pouring out in a most exciting and involving manner. The song tears out with a '50s shuffle style that really makes it." Writing in the NME in 1975, Charles Shaar Murray wrote of the song's "volcanically desperate optimism" and rated it "a classic". Shaar Murray added, with reference to "Cold Turkey" also: "I can't remember anybody else who put out two such utter killers in a row over the same period of time."

Village Voice critic Robert Christgau described "Instant Karma!" as Lennon's "best political song," while some other reviewers consider it to be the artist's finest post-Beatles recording. In their 1975 book The Beatles: An Illustrated Record, Roy Carr and Tony Tyler describe "Instant Karma!" as a "snappy little rocker" that "owes as much to the skilful production of Phil Spector as to the vitality of the overall performance," on which "[d]rummer Alan White excels." Another to highlight White's drumming amid the "collective genius" of all the musicians on "Instant Karma!", author Robert Rodriguez concludes of Lennon's activities on 27 January 1970: "Not many days in the history of rock and roll proved as everlastingly fruitful." In 1981, NME critic Bob Woffinden wrote of the single: "It was excellent. Lennon was characteristically simple and direct, but this time on a song with one of those magically catchy refrains."

Among Lennon biographers, Jon Wiener praises Lennon's "rich, deep voice" on a recording where the sound is "irresistible". Philip Norman describes the song as "similar to 'Cold Turkey' in tempo but far more relaxed and humorous", adding that Spector's production gave Lennon's voice "a taut expressiveness it had not had since 'Norwegian Wood'." While noting the significance of the session for George Harrison's career, author Simon Leng praises the recording as being "full of urgency and sheer excitement."

Stereogum contributors Timothy and Elizabeth Bracy rated it as Lennon's greatest solo song, calling it "an exhilarating gesture and proof that Lennon didn’t need anyone — even the Beatles — in order to make timeless music."

In 1989, Rolling Stone ranked "Instant Karma!" the 79th best single of the previous 25 years. In NME Originals: Beatles – The Solo Years 1970–1980, David Stubbs lists the song second among Lennon's "ten solo gems" (behind "Cold Turkey"), with the comment: "'Instant Karma!' epitomises the Lennon paradox, melding hippie idealism and rock'n'roll primal energy in an exhilarating mix." Matt Melis of Consequence of Sound placed it third on his 2009 list of "Top Ten Songs by Ex-Beatles". "Instant Karma!" has also appeared in the following critics' best-songs lists and books: Dave Marsh's The 1001 Greatest Singles Ever Made (1989; at number 638), 1000 Songs that Rock Your World by Dave Thompson (2011; number 56), the NME's "The 100 Best Songs of the 1970s" (2012; number 77), and Q magazine's "The 1001 Best Songs Ever" (2003; number 193). The Rock and Roll Hall of Fame includes the track among its "500 Songs That Shaped Rock and Roll".

== Re-releases and live version ==
"Instant Karma!"'s first appearance on a Lennon album, albeit slightly edited in length, was the 1975 compilation Shaved Fish. Urish and Bielen observe that the "advertising hyperbole" inherent in the song's title, through the inclusion of an exclamation mark, is given extra emphasis on this album cover. (Note: Apple's artwork for Shaved Fish featured an illustration by Michael Bryan for each of the compilation's tracks. "Instant Karma!" is depicted as a jar of instant coffee, with the top removed and a spoon beside the jar.) The song has featured – often with the full title "Instant Karma! (We All Shine On)" – on numerous posthumous compilations, including The John Lennon Collection (1982), the Lennon box set (1990), Lennon Legend (1997), Working Class Hero: The Definitive Lennon (2005), and Power to the People: The Hits (2010).

Lennon played "Instant Karma!" at his last full-length concert performance – the One to One benefit shows held at Madison Square Garden, New York, on 30 August 1972. His backing band comprised the group Elephant's Memory, in addition to Ono and drummer Jim Keltner. The 1986 album and video Live in New York City contains the afternoon performance of the song.

In July 1992, "Instant Karma!" was re-released as a single in the Netherlands, backed by "Oh My Love". Originally, copies of it were given away with early editions of The John Lennon Video Collection. When released in the rest of Europe (barring the UK), this single reissue gained two extra B-sides: "Mother" and "Bless You".

Of the two 1970 Top of the Pops performances, the "cue card" version appeared on The John Lennon Video Collection in October 1992, while the "knitting" performance was remixed and extended for release on the Lennon Legend DVD (2003). The "knitting" version was also included on the 8 December 2003 UK reissue of Lennon's and Ono's "Happy Xmas (War Is Over)" single.

== Cover versions and cultural references ==
Artists who have covered "Instant Karma!" include Toad the Wet Sprocket, Paul Weller, Duran Duran, Tater Totz with Cherie Currie, and Tokio Hotel. In 2007, the song provided the title for Amnesty International's multi-artist compilation of Lennon compositions, Instant Karma: The Amnesty International Campaign to Save Darfur, for which U2 recorded a cover version. In 2022, the American group Bleachers, formed by the singer and producer Jack Antonoff, covered the song for the soundtrack of the animated movie Minions: The Rise of Gru.

The title of Stephen King's 1977 horror novel The Shining came from Lennon's line "We all shine on." King was going to call the book The Shine, before realising that "shine" had been used as a derogatory term for blacks.

In 1988, Ono allowed the footwear and apparel company Nike to feature "Instant Karma!" in an advertising campaign, after a public outcry the previous year had forced her to withdraw permission for the use of the Beatles' "Revolution". Instant Karma Records was named after the song, and the Flaming Lips recorded their track "I Don't Understand Karma" in 2009 as a reply to "Instant Karma!"

== Personnel ==
According to Harry Castleman and Walter J. Podrazik, except where noted:

- John Lennon – lead vocals, piano, backing vocals
- George Harrison – electric and acoustic guitar, piano, backing vocals
- Klaus Voormann – bass guitar, electric piano, backing vocals
- Alan White – drums, piano, backing vocals
- Billy Preston – Hammond organ, backing vocals
- Yoko Ono – backing vocals
- Mal Evans – chimes, handclaps, backing vocals
- Scott CerJance – tambourine
- Allen Klein and revellers from London's Hatchett Club – backing vocals

== Charts and certifications ==
=== Weekly charts ===
Chart (1970)	Peak position
Australian Go-Set National Top 40	6
Austrian Ö3 Austria Top 40	4
Belgian Ultratop Singles (Wallonia)	4
Canadian RPM 100	2
Dutch MegaChart Singles	7
Irish Singles Chart	3
Italy (Musica e dischi)	2
Japanese Oricon Singles Chart	58
New Zealand Listener Chart	4
Norwegian VG-lista Singles	9
Swedish Kvällstoppen Chart	4
Swiss Hitparade	9
UK Singles Chart	5
US Billboard Hot 100	3
US Cash Box Top 100	3
West German Media Control Chart	7

Chart (1992)	Peak position
Swiss Singles Top 75	31

=== Year-end charts ===
Chart (1970)	Rank
Canadian RPM Top 100	21
Netherlands (Single Top 100)	81
US Billboard Year-End	34
US Cash Box	20

Region	Certification	Certified units/sales
United States (RIAA)	Gold	1,000,000^{^}
^{^} Shipments figures based on certification alone.

== Sources ==
- Blake, John (1981). All You Needed Was Love: The Beatles After the Beatles. Middlesex: Hamlyn Paperbacks. ISBN 0-600-20466-9.
- Blaney, John (2005). John Lennon: Listen to This Book (illustrated edn). [S.l.]: Paper Jukebox. ISBN 978-0-9544528-1-0.
- Brown, Mick (2008). Tearing Down the Wall of Sound: The Rise and Fall of Phil Spector. New York, NY: Vintage. ISBN 978-1-4000-7661-1.
- Browne, David (2011). Fire and Rain: The Beatles, Simon and Garfunkel, James Taylor, CSNY, and the Bittersweet Story of 1970. New York, NY: Da Capo Press. ISBN 978-0-30681-986-5.
- Carr, Roy; Tyler, Tony (1978). The Beatles: An Illustrated Record. London: Trewin Copplestone Publishing. ISBN 0-450-04170-0.
- Castleman, Harry; Podrazik, Walter J. (1976). All Together Now: The First Complete Beatles Discography 1961–1975. New York, NY: Ballantine Books. ISBN 0-345-25680-8.
- Doggett, Peter (2011). You Never Give Me Your Money: The Beatles After the Breakup. New York, NY: It Books. ISBN 978-0-06-177418-8.
- Du Noyer, Paul (2010). John Lennon: The Stories Behind Every Song 1970–1980 (rev. edn). London: Carlton Books. ISBN 978-1-84732-665-2.
- Edmondson, Jacqueline (2010). John Lennon: A Biography (illustrated edn). ABC-CLIO. ISBN 978-0-313-37938-3.
- Everett, Walter (1999). The Beatles as Musicians: Revolver Through the Anthology. New York, NY: Oxford University Press. ISBN 0-19-512941-5.
- Frontani, Michael (2009). "The Solo Years". In Womack, Kenneth (ed.). The Cambridge Companion to the Beatles. Cambridge, UK: Cambridge University Press. ISBN 978-0-521-68976-2.
- Hertsgaard, Mark (1996). A Day in the Life: The Music and Artistry of the Beatles. London: Pan Books. ISBN 0-330-33891-9.
- King, Stephen; Underwood, Tim; Miller, Chuck (1988). Bare Bones: Conversations on Terror with Stephen King. New York, NY: McGraw-Hill. ISBN 978-0-07065759-5.
- Klein, Bethany (2010). As Heard on TV: Popular Music in Advertising. Farnham, Surrey: Ashgate Publishing. ISBN 978-1-4094-0764-5.
- Lawrence, Ken (2005). John Lennon: In His Own Words. Kansas City, MO: Andrews McMeel Publishing. ISBN 978-0-7407-9312-7.
- Leng, Simon (2006). While My Guitar Gently Weeps: The Music of George Harrison. Milwaukee, WI: Hal Leonard. ISBN 978-1-423-406099.
- Madinger, Chip; Easter, Mark (2000). Eight Arms to Hold You: The Solo Beatles Compendium. Chesterfield, MO: 44.1 Productions. ISBN 0-615-11724-4.
- Miles, Barry (2001). The Beatles Diary Volume 1: The Beatles Years. London: Omnibus Press. ISBN 0-7119-8308-9.
- Norman, Philip (2009). John Lennon: The Life. New York, NY: HarperCollins. ISBN 978-0-06-075402-0.
- Ribowsky, Mark (2006). He's a Rebel: Phil Spector – Rock and Roll's Legendary Producer. Cambridge, MA: Da Capo Press. ISBN 978-0-306-81471-6.
- Rodriguez, Robert (2010). Fab Four FAQ 2.0: The Beatles' Solo Years, 1970–1980. Milwaukee, WI: Backbeat Books. ISBN 978-1-4165-9093-4.
- Rodriguez, Robert (2013). Solo in the 70s: John, Paul, George, Ringo: 1970–1980. Downers Grove, IL: Parading Press. ISBN 978-0-9892555-0-9.
- Rogan, Johnny (1997). The Complete Guide to the Music of John Lennon. London: Omnius Press. ISBN 0-7119-5599-9.
- Schaffner, Nicholas (1978). The Beatles Forever. New York, NY: McGraw-Hill. ISBN 0-07-055087-5.
- Southall, Brian; Perry, Rupert (2009). Northern Songs: The True Story of the Beatles Song Publishing Empire. London: Omnibus Press. ISBN 978-0-85712-027-4.
- Spitz, Bob (2005). The Beatles: The Biography. New York, NY: Little, Brown. ISBN 0-316-80352-9.
- Spizer, Bruce (2005). The Beatles Solo on Apple Records. New Orleans, LA: 498 Productions. ISBN 0-9662649-5-9.
- Sutherland, Steve, ed. (2003). NME Originals: Lennon. London: IPC Ignite!.
- Urish, Ben; Bielen, Kenneth G. (2007). The Words and Music of John Lennon. Westport, CT: Praeger. ISBN 978-0-275-99180-7.
- Wiener, Jon (1991). Come Together: John Lennon in His Time (Illini Books edn). Urbana, IL: University of Illinois Press. ISBN 9780252061318.
- Williams, Richard (2003). Phil Spector: Out of His Head. London: Omnibus Press. ISBN 978-0-7119-9864-3.
- Winn, John C. (2009). That Magic Feeling: The Beatles' Recorded Legacy, Volume Two, 1966–1970. New York, NY: Three Rivers Press. ISBN 978-0-307-45239-9.
- Woffinden, Bob (1981). The Beatles Apart. London: Proteus. ISBN 0-906071-89-5.
- Womack, Kenneth (2014). The Beatles Encyclopedia: Everything Fab Four. Santa Barbara, CA: ABC-CLIO. ISBN 978-0-313-39171-2.
- Woods, Robert H. (2013). Evangelical Christians and Popular Culture: Pop Goes the Gospel (illustrated edn). ABC-CLIO. ISBN 978-0-313-38654-1.
