= Shaved Fish =

Compilation album by John Lennon with Plastic Ono Band
- Released: 20 October 1975
- Recorded: June 1969 – July 1974
- Genre: Rock
- Length: 41:55
- Label: Apple
- Producers: John Lennon, Yoko Ono, Phil Spector

John Lennon chronology
Rock 'n' Roll (1975)	Shaved Fish (1975)	Double Fantasy (1980)

Singles from Shaved Fish
- 1. "Imagine" Released: 24 October 1975 (UK)

Shaved Fish is a compilation album by English rock musician John Lennon with the Plastic Ono Band, issued in October 1975 on Apple Records. It contains all of the singles that he had issued up to that point in the United States as a solo artist, with the exception of "Stand by Me", which had been released earlier that year. The only compilation of Lennon's non-Beatles recordings released during his lifetime, the album peaked at number 8 in the UK and number 12 in the US. It was also Lennon's final album released on Apple Records before it was shut down in 1975, later to be revived in the 1990s.

== Background ==
After the release of his album of oldies cover versions, Rock 'n' Roll (1975), Lennon was planning to work on an album of new material. However, when his wife Yoko Ono became pregnant, he decided to reissue songs from his solo career.

What I found out was, when I went to look for the "Cold Turkey" master tapes, nobody knew where they were. I had to use dubs of "Power to the People" because the tapes were gone, nobody could give a damn at the record companies because they weren't... you know, that big. Big enough for them to be interested... I thought if I don't put this package together, some of the work is just going to go... they will be lost forever.

— John Lennon

== Content ==
Shaved Fish includes many of Lennon's most popular solo recordings in their original 45 rpm single edits. Five of the songs had not been previously issued on an album: "Cold Turkey", "Instant Karma!", "Power to the People", the holiday single "Happy Xmas (War Is Over)" and "Give Peace a Chance". The latter appears in truncated form and opens side one, while an excerpt of a live version of the song closes side two. Eight of these singles made the Top 40 on the Billboard chart, with "Whatever Gets You thru the Night" going to number 1; five made the top 10 in the United Kingdom. "Imagine", never previously released as a single in the UK, was issued as such concurrent to the release of this album.

== Artwork and packaging ==
Roy Kohara was the art director of the album, and the illustrations were made by Michael Bryan. The cover is divided into twelve rectangles: one for each of the eleven songs on the LP, and one for the album title, written in Bruce Mikita font (also known as Novel Open).

The album title originates from the Japanese food katsuobushi, a kind of dried fish.

== Release ==
Shaved Fish was released on 20 October 1975 in the US and 24 October in the UK. The release of the album came less than three weeks after the resolution of Lennon's long-running immigration dispute and the birth of Sean Lennon.

Several of the master tapes were unavailable for the compilation, and dubs from 45 rpm single records were used. Due to this, the first release of the compact disc in May 1987 suffered from poor sound quality and needed to be remastered. The improved CD version was issued in December 1987, restoring the full fadeouts that were shortened in some of the songs on the original release.

In February 1976, following the release of the album, Lennon's recording contract expired, and he was uninterested in re-signing with EMI/Capitol.

== Reception ==
Professional ratings
Review scores
Source	Rating
AllMusic	4/5 stars
Christgau's Record Guide	B+
MusicHound	3/5
The Rolling Stone Album Guide	3/5 stars

=== Critical ===
Robert Christgau of The Village Voice called the album "eleven shots in the dark from the weirdest major rock and roller of the early '70s" and said "not counting the two available on must-own albums, the only great cuts are 'Instant Karma' (Lennon's best political song) and '#9 Dream.'" Dave Marsh of Rolling Stone praised the inclusion of non-album songs like "Instant Karma!", calling it "Lennon's best solo track", but deemed the compilation "so diffuse that it probably does present an accurate overview of Lennon's confused career since leaving the Beatles." He concluded that the album was evidence "not only of John Lennon's genius but of his continuing career difficulty." Charles Shaar Murray of the NME called Shaved Fish "as nifty a Greatest Hits album as you could expect from anybody who hasn't already put one out" and deemed the performances "stunning throughout". However, he felt the track selection was "a little off whack", particularly the inclusion of "Mother", which he found to be "such an integral part of the initial Plastic Ono Band album that I feel it's manifestly unfair to both artist and public to include it on an album of this nature."

A Creem magazine reader's poll in 1975 included the album among the top five "Best Reissues" of 1975, placing fourth, behind two Rolling Stones compilations, Made in the Shade and Metamorphosis, and Bob Dylan's The Basement Tapes.

=== Commercial ===
The album was released in the UK on 24 October 1975, peaking at number 8. (Note: UK Apple PCS 7173) Released from the album on the same day in the UK was the single "Imagine", backed with "Working Class Hero", charting at number 6. The single was also Lennon's last for Apple Records.

The album later re-charted in the UK on 17 January 1981, at number 11.

== Track listing ==
All songs by John Lennon, except where noted.

=== Side one ===
No.	Song	Length	Notes
1	"Give Peace a Chance"	0:57	Only the first minute of "Give Peace a Chance" is excerpted here.; Issued as a single 4 July 1969 (UK) and 7 July 1969 (US).; Credited to Lennon–McCartney on the original single issue and vinyl edition of Shaved Fish, the song now appears as credited to Lennon alone.
2	"Cold Turkey"	5:01	Issued as a single 20 October 1969 (US) and 24 October 1969 (UK).
3	"Instant Karma! (We All Shine On)"	3:21	UK single mix, issued as a single in the UK on 6 February 1970; a different mix was issued as a single in the US on 20 February 1970.
4	"Power to the People"	3:21	Issued as a single 12 March 1971 (UK) and 22 March 1971 (US).
5	"Mother"	5:03	From the album John Lennon/Plastic Ono Band (1970).; Exclusive edit, different from the single edit issued on 28 December 1970 (US). This edit includes the bells at the intro not present on the single edit, and fades out later than the single but earlier than the LP version.
6	"Woman Is the Nigger of the World" (John Lennon, Yoko Ono)	4:37	From the album Some Time in New York City (1972).; Exclusive edit; a longer version had been released on an American single on 24 April 1972 and on the LP.

=== Side two ===
No.	Song	Length	Notes
1	"Imagine"	3:02	From the album Imagine (1971).; Issued as a single 11 October 1971 (US) and 24 October 1975 (UK).
2	"Whatever Gets You thru the Night"	3:03	From the album Walls and Bridges (1974).; With Elton John on piano and backing vocals.; Exclusive edit. The single, issued 23 September 1974 (US) and 4 October 1974 (UK) ran for 3:20, while the LP version was 3:24.
3	"Mind Games"	4:12	From the album Mind Games (1973).; Issued as a single 29 October 1973 (US) and 16 November 1973 (UK).
4	"#9 Dream"	4:47	From the album Walls and Bridges.; Issued as a single 16 December 1974 (US) and 31 January 1975 (UK).
5	"Happy Xmas (War Is Over)" / "Give Peace a Chance (Reprise)" (Lennon, Ono)	4:15	"Happy Xmas" issued as a single on 1 December 1971 (US) and 24 November 1972 (UK).; An excerpt from a live performance of "Give Peace a Chance" recorded at the 1972 "One to One" concerts is crossfaded onto the song's ending.

== Certifications ==
Certifications for Shaved Fish
Region	Certification	Certified units/sales
United Kingdom (BPI)	Gold	100,000^{^}
United States (RIAA)	Platinum	1,000,000^{^}
^{^} Shipments figures based on certification alone.
