= The John Lennon Video Collection =

Video by John Lennon
- Released: October 1992
- Recorded: 1969–1980
- Genre: Rock, pop
- Length: 80 minutes
- Label: EMI Records, Pioneer Artists, Picture Music International, Capitol Video
- Director: Gerard Meola, John Lennon, Yoko Ono, John Canemaker
- Producer: Yoko Ono (executive); Martin J. Haxby (executive); Martin R. Smith (produced and compiled by); Karen Mateyk (associate); Kerri Tarmey (associate); Stanley Dorfman (producer, Milk and Honey videos)

John Lennon chronology
Imagine: The Film (1985)	The John Lennon Video Collection (1992)	Lennon Legend: The Very Best of John Lennon (2003)

The John Lennon Video Collection is a music video album compilation that was released on VHS, VCD and LaserDisc in October 1992 in the US, UK, Europe, Australia and New Zealand as a collection of old and new promotional videos.

The collection is significant for containing most of the original versions of Lennon's music videos, before Yoko Ono remade and re-edited them for the Lennon Legend: The Very Best of John Lennon DVD in 2003.

== Content ==
The video compilation contains 19 music videos from Lennon's solo career, 16 of which had never been commercially available.

Six of the videos were specially made by Yoko Ono for this release from archival material.

== Track listing ==
All track notes taken from the video end credits.

No.	Title	Place of Origin and Director	Length
1.	"Give Peace a Chance" (Version 1, color)	1969 promo from Bed Peace film, Lennon & Ono	5:04
2.	"Cold Turkey" (Version 1)	1969 promo, Lennon & Ono	5:21
3.	"Instant Karma!" (Live "Cue Card" Version)	1971, Top of the Pops	3:19
4.	"Power to the People" (Version 2)	1992 video, Ono & Gerald Meola	3:20
5.	"Happy Xmas (War Is Over)" (Version 1)	1992 video, Ono & Meola	3:42
6.	"Mind Games" (Version 2)	1992 video, Ono & Meola	4:18
7.	"Whatever Gets You thru the Night" (Version 2)	1992 video, John Canemaker, Ono & Meola	3:34
8.	"#9 Dream" (Version 1)	1992 video, Ono & Meola	4:48
9.	"Stand by Me" (Live, Version 1)	1975, The Old Grey Whistle Test	3:56
10.	"Slippin' and Slidin'" (Live)	1975, The Old Grey Whistle Test	2:32
11.	"Imagine" (Version 1)	1972 Imagine film, Lennon & Ono	3:33
12.	"(Just Like) Starting Over" (Version 1)	1992 video, 1980 footage; Lennon, Ono & Meola	4:04
13.	"Woman" (only version)	1981 promo, Lennon & Ono	3:43
14.	"Nobody Told Me" (Version 1)	1984 promo, Lennon & Ono	3:48
15.	"Borrowed Time" (Version 1)	1984 promo, Lennon & Ono	4:43
16.	"I'm Stepping Out" (only version)	1984 promo, Lennon & Ono	4:11
17.	"Jealous Guy" (Version 3)	1988 Imagine: John Lennon documentary, Steve Purcell & Andrew Solt	4:29
18.	"Grow Old with Me" (only version)	1984 promo, Lennon & Ono	3:14
19.	"Imagine" (Live)	1975 Salute to Lew Grade concert, Dave Wilson	3:19

== Charts ==
Chart (1993)	Peak position
Billboard Music Video Sales	26
