= John Lennon/Plastic Ono Band =

Studio album by John Lennon
- Released: 11 December 1970
- Recorded: June 1970, 26 September – 23 October 1970
- Studios: EMI, London
- Genres: Rock; blues; avant-pop
- Length: 39:16
- Label: Apple
- Producers: John Lennon; Yoko Ono; Phil Spector

John Lennon chronology
Live Peace in Toronto 1969 (1969)	John Lennon/Plastic Ono Band (1970)	Imagine (1971)

Singles from John Lennon/Plastic Ono Band
- 1. "Mother" Released: 28 December 1970

John Lennon/Plastic Ono Band is the first solo album by English musician John Lennon after the break-up of the Beatles. Backed by the Plastic Ono Band (consisting of Lennon on guitar, Ringo Starr on drums, and Klaus Voormann on bass), it was released by Apple Records on 11 December 1970 in tandem with the similarly titled album by his wife, Yoko Ono. At the time of its issue, John Lennon/Plastic Ono Band received mixed reviews overall, but later came to be widely regarded as one of Lennon's best solo albums.

Co-produced by Lennon, Ono and Phil Spector, it followed Lennon's recording of three experimental releases with Ono and a live album from the 1969 version of the Plastic Ono Band. John Lennon/Plastic Ono Band contains a largely raw production sound with songs heavily influenced by Lennon's recent primal therapy. Its lyrics reflect Lennon's personal issues and includes themes of child-parent abandonment and psychological suffering. The tracks were recorded in September and October 1970 at Abbey Road Studios in London, simultaneously with Ono's solo album.

John Lennon/Plastic Ono Band peaked at number eight on the UK Albums Chart and number six on the US Billboard 200. In 1987, Rolling Stone ranked it fourth in its list "The 100 Best Albums of the Last Twenty Years" and in 2012, ranked it number 23 in their list of the "500 Greatest Albums of All Time". It was voted number 244 in Colin Larkin's All Time Top 1000 Albums (2000). In 2000, the album was remixed with two bonus tracks, "Power to the People" and "Do the Oz". The album's 2021 Ultimate Mixes reissue, in the eight-disc Ultimate Collection box set, features 159 previously unreleased mixes, demos, outtakes, and isolated track elements.

== Background ==
The level of his pain was enormous ... He was almost completely nonfunctional. He couldn't leave the house, he could hardly leave his room ... This was someone the whole world adored, and it didn't change a thing. At the center of all that fame and wealth and adulation was just a lonely little kid.

— Arthur Janov, on Lennon's psychological state

Following the break-up of the Beatles in April 1970, John Lennon and his wife Yoko Ono undertook primal therapy with the guidance of Arthur Janov for four weeks at his London offices. The three then flew to Los Angeles to continue the therapy for four months. Janov's therapy technique emphasised emotionally reliving repressed childhood traumas rather than analytical discussion.

Lennon and Ono stayed in a rented house in Bel Air, keeping a low profile and committing fully to Janov's course. Lennon embraced the discipline as he had Transcendental Meditation in the late 1960s, and the act of engaging with past traumas became "too primal". Ono later commented that primal therapy helped curb his possessiveness towards her, as he recognised that his feelings of jealousy stemmed from events that took place long before they met.

With the experience he received from the therapy, Lennon was able to channel his emotions into an album's worth of self-revelatory material. In July, he started to record demos of songs that would show up on John Lennon/Plastic Ono Band. On 26 July, he taped numerous demos of "God", which includes the line "I don't believe in Beatles". "When a Boy Meets a Girl" was among the songs Lennon demoed at this time, but he did not record it for the album.

Lennon's therapy was never completed due to the expiry of his US visa. Janov had intended that Lennon's treatment would require a minimum of a year, such was the severity of his trauma. Janov expressed concern that the therapy had ended prematurely and that Lennon's rediscovered anger over his childhood remained unresolved.

== Music and lyrics ==
Lennon's experience in primal therapy strongly influenced both the lyrical content of the album, pushing him toward themes of child–parent relationships and psychological suffering, and the simple yet intense style of the album's music. Throughout the album Lennon touches on many personal issues: his abandonment by his parents, in "Mother" (though he denied that that was what the song was about on a posthumously released live album); the means by which young people are made into soldiers, in "Working Class Hero"; a reminder that, despite his rage and pain, Lennon still embraces "Love"; and "God", a renunciation of external saviours. In the piano-driven climax of "God", after listing a handful of things he does not believe in, including Jesus, Hitler, Buddha, Elvis, "Zimmerman" (Bob Dylan) and Beatles, Lennon proclaims that he believes only in himself and Ono.

"Look at Me" dates from the period of the White Album (1968), and is built on a fingerpicking guitar pattern very similar to the one Lennon used in "Dear Prudence", "Happiness Is a Warm Gun" and "Julia". Donovan claimed that he taught Lennon this technique while the two were in Rishikesh in 1968. "Remember" uses the same piano riff that Lennon played in the discarded coda to the Beatles' July 1969 recording of "Something".

"My Mummy's Dead", which closes Plastic Ono Band, is partly set to the tune of the nursery rhyme "Three Blind Mice". The recording used on the album was taken from Lennon's Los Angeles demos.

== Recording ==
Having exhausted the extensions of their American visas, Lennon and Ono returned from the US on 15 September 1970. Soon afterwards, Ono miscarried at close to eight months pregnant, and Lennon's equilibrium was tested when his father, Alf Lennon, resumed contact, having recently remarried and become a father again. At Alf's request, they met up at Tittenhurst Park for Lennon's 30th birthday, but Lennon launched into a primal therapy-inspired tirade against him and, according to the account Alf left with his solicitor, threatened to kill him.

Recording for the album took place at Abbey Road Studios in London, beginning on 26 September. Lennon played guitar or piano on the songs, with bassist Klaus Voormann and drummer Ringo Starr as the other core musicians. The album title refers to the Plastic Ono Band, the conceptual band Lennon and Ono formed in 1969 of various supporting musicians they would use on their various solo albums. Lennon asked Phil Spector, who had produced Lennon's hit "Instant Karma!" earlier that year, to co-produce the new album. Since they were unable to contact Spector before recording began, Allen Klein, Lennon's manager, took out an advertisement in Billboard magazine that read: "Phil! John is ready this weekend."

Spector and Apple artist Billy Preston each played piano on a track. During the sessions, Lennon, Voormann and Starr jammed on a variety of songs in between recording the new tracks: "When a Boy Meets a Girl", "That's All Right Mama", "Glad All Over", "Honey Don't", "Don't Be Cruel", "Hound Dog" and "Matchbox". They also taped the basic track for Starr's "Early 1970" in which the drummer describes his relationship with each of his former bandmates; in the verse dedicated to Lennon, Starr sings, "They screamed and they cried, now they're free".

As longstanding friends of Lennon, Voormann and Starr were disturbed by his emotional behaviour in the studio. In his 2004 book Postcards from the Boys, Starr recalls that Lennon would burst out crying or start screaming midway through recording a track. Voormann said that Lennon would change from being upbeat to highly emotional and would discuss his feelings with Ono as they listened to playbacks in the studio control room. In Voormann's view, the effects of Lennon's therapy were especially confronting to Starr, since "The old John was gone; it was a different John. It wasn't the one he was used to." (Note: In a 2015 interview, however, Starr called John Lennon/Plastic Ono Band "one of the best experiences of being on a record I have ever had". He said that due to their closeness, he and Lennon "were psychic where the atmosphere was going to go".)

According to music critic Richie Unterberger, bootlegs from the sessions suggest that Lennon was far from the despondent artist reflected in the finished album. As the ensemble recorded "Remember" on 9 October, Lennon's 30th birthday, George Harrison visited the studio and delivered a tape of "It's Johnny's Birthday", after Ono had asked Lennon's friends for musical greetings to mark the occasion. (Note: Starr's gift was "Happy Birthday, John", a 79-second piece in the style of Chuck Berry's "Johnny B. Goode". It included contributions from Preston, Voormann and Stephen Stills.) The session tapes reveal Lennon and Starr's delight at Harrison's arrival. In author Robert Rodriguez's description, the meeting reflects the three former Beatles' closeness, at the expense of Paul McCartney, as well as Lennon's playfulness while making Plastic Ono Band.

Lennon and Ono produced Plastic Ono Band largely on their own, as Spector was absent for much of the recording sessions. Spector mixed the album for three days towards the end of October. All work on the record was completed by 27 October, when Lennon and Ono flew to New York to publicise primal therapy and collaborate on the experimental films Up Your Legs Forever and Fly.

== Artwork ==
Lennon's album cover is almost identical to Ono's companion piece, the sole difference being that on Ono's cover, she is lying on Lennon's body. The photo was taken at Lennon's Tittenhurst Park estate with a consumer-grade Instamatic camera by actor Dan Richter, who also worked as an assistant for the Lennons at the time. The initial compact disc issue of the album listed the title and artist, while the 2000 remixed version restores the original artwork. In addition, the original LP had no track listing on the back cover, which instead showed a school photo of Lennon in his youth.

The LP included a lyric sheet on one side of its inner sleeve. Despite Capitol Records' concerns over Lennon's profanities in "I Found Out" and "Working Class Hero", the lyrics appeared uncensored in the US album package. In the UK, EMI ensured that each mention of "fucking" in "Working Class Hero" was bowdlerised through the use of asterisks.

== Release ==
John Lennon/Plastic Ono Band was released in both the UK and US on 11 December 1970, the same day as Ono's matching album. Lennon considered issuing "Love" as a single in the US but settled on "Mother". The song was edited down to under four minutes through the removal of the opening funeral bells and an early fadeout. Backed by Ono's track "Why", the single was released there on 28 December. In Japan, the album's title was John no Tamashii (ジョンの魂), which translates as "John's Soul". Several US radio stations banned "Working Class Hero" because of the song's use of the word "fucking".

I think it's realistic and it's true to me that has been developing over the years from "In My Life", "I'm a Loser", "Help!", "Strawberry Fields". They're all personal records ... I didn't really enjoy writing third person songs ... But because of my hangups, and other things, I would only now and then specifically write about me. Now I wrote all about me and that's why I like it. It's me!

— Lennon's view on Plastic Ono Band, as offered to Rolling Stone in December 1970

Lennon viewed Plastic Ono Band as his best work up to that point. He called it "Sgt. Lennon", referring to the Beatles' 1967 album Sgt. Pepper's Lonely Hearts Club Band. His promotion for the album included a lengthy interview with Jann Wenner of Rolling Stone, recorded in New York on 8 December and published in two installments under the title Lennon Remembers. As with his new music, Lennon's comments reflected the effects of primal therapy. He used the opportunity to discuss his troubled childhood, debunk the Beatles as a myth, and denigrate his former bandmates' solo albums. He also dismissed the effectiveness of the 1960s cultural revolution as a "dream" and committed to political protest as his new artistic direction. Together with the sentiments of "God", the interview ended any hope of the Beatles reuniting and was followed soon after by McCartney filing suit in a London court to dissolve the group as a legal partnership.

The album and Lennon's political stance furthered his credibility among underground radicals, as the New Left welcomed his debunking of the Beatles' image. Its commercial performance nevertheless paled beside Harrison's concurrently released All Things Must Pass and McCartney's self-titled solo album, issued in April. Plastic Ono Band peaked at number 8 in the UK and number 6 in the US, spending eighteen weeks in the top 100. In the Netherlands, it was number 1 for seven weeks.

Lennon was especially aggrieved that his LP was overshadowed by the acclaim afforded All Things Must Pass. According to ABKCO executive Allan Steckler, neither Klein nor promotions man Pete Bennett knew how to go about marketing Plastic Ono Band in the US, where it received minimal AM airplay. Starr attributed the muted public response to the album's paucity of "toe-tappers".

== Contemporary critical reception ==
Although John Lennon/Plastic Ono Band received some highly favourable reviews, critical reception to the album was mixed overall. Andy Gray of the NME said it offered truths that would resonate with most listeners but that Lennon was governed by "a great big chip on his shoulder about class consciousness and the unfairness of the world". Gray also wrote: "I have rarely heard so much anguish and suffering put into a track as in the first song, 'Mother'." The Guardian's Geoffrey Cannon wrote that Lennon had taken the self-centredness of McCartney to an obsessive level. He predicted that the songs would have limited interest but added: "Lennon's album makes a deep impression, if more on him than us. He screams and cries, desolation, bitterness, anguish. This is the album of a man of black bile. This is declamation, not music." Writing in The Times, Richard Williams described Plastic Ono Band as "almost unbearably stark" and "not an album I can put on for pleasure". (Note: Melody Maker's Michael Watts wrote: "The album is not going to convert anyone who does not already like Lennon's musical approach. Melodically there is nothing earth-shattering but then, Lennon has never set out to become another Cole Porter.")

Reviewing for Creem, Dave Marsh found it "totally enthralling to see that Lennon has once again unified, to some degree, his life and his music into a truly whole statement". He deemed Lennon's perspective "elitist" and less adventurous than Ono's on her LP, but nevertheless likened the album to the highly political statements made by jazz artists such as Archie Shepp, Charlie Parker and Charles Mingus in their music. Michael Ross, also of Creem, wrote in the December 1970 issue "This record is John, the man, destroying the dream, the idol, the idols, revitalizing his dirt-poor emotions, feeling that in the midst of change, he is, love is." Don Heckman of The New York Times was unimpressed by Plastic Ono Band, calling it a "group of empty selections" that, like McCartney's album, showed its creator to be overly preoccupied with himself and weakened artistically as a solo performer. Billboard's reviewer described the album as "Self determination music, intensely analytical of self with production values kept down to the minimum", and predicted it would remain the subject of analysis for years like Sgt. Pepper.

John Gabree of High Fidelity deemed the LP "a tremendously exciting listening experience, perhaps the best any Beatle has ever offered". He praised the musicianship, sparse arrangements and Lennon's directness, and said that on the strength of Plastic Ono Band and Harrison's All Things Must Pass, he was not bothered if the Beatles ever reunited as a band. Robert Christgau named John Lennon/Plastic Ono Band the best album of 1970 in his year-end list for The Village Voice, and in a decade-end list, he ranked it 21st best from the 1970s.

== Retrospective assessments and legacy ==
Professional ratings
Review scores
Source	Rating
AllMusic	5/5 stars
Christgau's Record Guide	A
Creem Magazine	(positive)
Mojo	5/5 stars
MusicHound Rock	5/5
NME	8/10
Paste	5/5 stars
Q	4/5 stars
Rolling Stone	5/5 stars
The Rolling Stone Album Guide	5/5 stars
Uncut	5/5 stars

Plastic Ono Band is considered by some to be Lennon's best solo album and is certainly one of his most influential works. The record became known as "the Primal Album". Janov incorporated it into his therapy course, although he rued that Lennon had cut off his therapy prematurely and that "We had opened him up, and we didn't have time to put him back together again."

Music critic Greil Marcus remarked, "John's singing in the last verse of 'God' may be the finest in all of rock." In a retrospective review for Rolling Stone, Robert Christgau wrote that the album's lyrics are political, existential, and carefully thought out, while Spector's production is elegantly simple so that each instrument resonates. Christgau added: "Left out in the open, without protective harmonies or racket, Lennon's singing takes on an expressive specificity that anyone in search of the century's great vocal performances would be foolish to overlook." Garry Mulholland of Uncut describes it as a "masterpiece" that "remains the most profound and perfectly realised confessional album that rock'n'roll has produced".

Mojo critic John Harris includes Plastic Ono Band among "the trilogy of truly essential post-Beatles solo albums", along with All Things Must Pass and Wings' Band on the Run. In 2008, it was the subject of a documentary film by Matthew Longfellow as part of Eagle Rock's Classic Albums series. Coinciding with the 50th anniversary of Lennon and Ono's twin 1970 albums, Thames & Hudson published the book John & Yoko/Plastic Ono Band, which includes illustrations by Voormann. (Note: In an interview to promote the book, Voormann described Lennon's Plastic Ono Band as "the best of all albums I've ever heard", citing its intimacy and lack of studio embellishments.)

In 2000, Q placed John Lennon/Plastic Ono Band at number 62 in its list of the "100 Greatest British Albums Ever". In 1987, the album was ranked fourth on Rolling Stone's list of the 100 best albums of the period 1967–87, and in 2003, it was placed at number 22 in the magazine's list of the 500 Greatest Albums of All Time, 23 in a 2012 revised list, and 85 in a 2020 revised list. In 2006, the album was placed by Pitchfork at number 60 of its Top 100 Albums of the 1970s. In 2006, the album was chosen by Time as one of the 100 best albums of all time.

== Subsequent releases ==
After Lennon's death, EMI's Parlophone label reissued Plastic Ono Band, along with seven other Lennon albums, as part of a box set, which was released in the UK on 15 June 1981. (Note: UK EMI JLB8.) In 2000, Ono supervised a remixing of John Lennon/Plastic Ono Band for its remastered CD reissue, including two bonus tracks: Lennon's 1971 hit "Power to the People", and "Do the Oz", originally released as the B-side to "God Save Us" under the name Elastic Oz Band and later part of the 1998 box set John Lennon Anthology.

In 2003, Mobile Fidelity Sound Lab reissued the album in 24-karat Gold CD audio and 180-gram half-speed mastered GAIN 2 Ultra Analog in vinyl reissues. In 2010, a digital remaster of Lennon's entire discography was released, using original mixes and artwork.

A 50th Anniversary reissue of the album was released on 23 April 2021, under the title John Lennon/Plastic Ono Band: The Ultimate Collection. The eight-disc box set spreads over six CDs and two Blu-ray HD discs, and features 159 new mixes, including previously unreleased demos, studio outtakes, and isolated track elements, along with 5.1 surround and Dolby Atmos mixes.

== Track listing ==
All tracks are written by John Lennon, except where noted.

Side one
No.	Title	Length
1.	"Mother"	5:34
2.	"Hold On"	1:52
3.	"I Found Out"	3:37
4.	"Working Class Hero"	3:48
5.	"Isolation"	2:51

Side two
No.	Title	Length
6.	"Remember"	4:36
7.	"Love"	3:21
8.	"Well Well Well"	5:59
9.	"Look at Me"	2:53
10.	"God"	4:09
11.	"My Mummy's Dead"	0:49
Total length:		39:16

2000 reissue bonus tracks
No.	Title	Writer(s)	Length
12.	"Power to the People"		3:22
13.	"Do the Oz"	Lennon, Yoko Ono	3:07
Total length:			44:45

Bonus tracks on the 2021 Ultimate Mixes reissue
No.	Title	Length
12.	"Give Peace A Chance"	4:55
13.	"Cold Turkey"	5:01
14.	"Instant Karma! (We All Shine On)"	3:18
Total length:		52:30

== Personnel ==
Track numbering refers to CD and digital releases of the album.

- John Lennon – vocals (all), acoustic guitar (4, 7, 9, 11), electric guitar (2, 3, 8), piano (1, 5, 6), organ (5), tack piano (10)
- Ringo Starr – drums (1–3, 5, 6, 8, 10)
- Klaus Voormann – bass guitar (1–3, 5, 6, 8, 10)

Additional musicians:

- Phil Spector – piano (7)
- Billy Preston – grand piano (10)
- Yoko Ono – "wind"
- Mal Evans – "tea and sympathy"

== Charts ==
1970–1971 weekly chart performance
Chart (1970–1971)	Peak position
Australian Kent Music Report	3
Canadian RPM 100 Albums	2
Italian Albums (Musica e dischi)	8
Japanese Oricon LPs	5
Netherlands MegaChart Albums	1
Norwegian VG-lista Albums	4
Swedish Kvällstoppen Chart	8
UK Albums Chart	8
US Billboard Top LPs	6
West German Media Control Albums Chart	39

2021 weekly chart performance
Chart (2021)	Peak position
German Albums (GfK)	7
Irish Albums (IRMA)	59
Scottish Albums (OCC)	2
Swedish Albums (Sverigetopplistan)	46

1971 year-end chart performance
Chart (1971)	Position
Australian Albums	22
Netherlands MegaChart Albums	2
US Billboard Year-End	84

== Certifications ==
Certifications for John Lennon/Plastic Ono Band
Region	Certification	Certified units/sales
United Kingdom (BPI) 2021 edition	Silver	60,000^{‡}
United States (RIAA)	Gold	500,000^{^}
^{^} Shipments figures based on certification alone.^{‡} Sales+streaming figures based on certification alone.
