= Happy Xmas (War Is Over) =

1971 single by John Lennon and Yoko Ono

- US picture sleeve

Single by John Lennon and Yoko Ono and the Plastic Ono Band with the Harlem Community Choir
- B-side: "Listen, the Snow Is Falling" (Yoko/Plastic Ono Band)
- Released: 1 December 1971 (US); 24 November 1972 (UK)
- Recorded: 28 and 31 October 1971
- Studio: Record Plant East (New York)
- Genre: Rock; Christmas
- Length: 3:35
- Label: Apple
- Songwriters: John Lennon; Yoko Ono
- Producers: Phil Spector; John Lennon; Yoko Ono

John Lennon American singles chronology
"Imagine" (1971)	"Happy Xmas (War Is Over)" (1971)	"Woman Is the Nigger of the World" (1972)

John Lennon British singles chronology
"Power to the People" (1971)	"Happy Xmas (War Is Over)" (1972)	"Mind Games" (1973)

Music video
- "Happy Xmas (War Is Over)" on YouTube

Alternative cover
- 1982 US reissue

"Happy Xmas (War Is Over)" is a 1971 Christmas song released as a single by the Plastic Ono Band with the Harlem Community Choir. It was the seventh single issued by John Lennon outside his work with the Beatles. The song reached number four in the United Kingdom, where its release was delayed until November 1972, and has periodically returned to the UK Singles Chart, most notably after Lennon's murder in December 1980, when it peaked at number two.

A protest song opposing United States involvement in the Vietnam War, "Happy Xmas (War Is Over)" later became a Christmas standard. It has been recorded by many artists, included on seasonal compilation albums, and cited in polls as a popular holiday song. In a UK-wide poll in December 2012, it was ranked tenth on the ITV television special The Nation's Favourite Christmas Song.

== Background ==
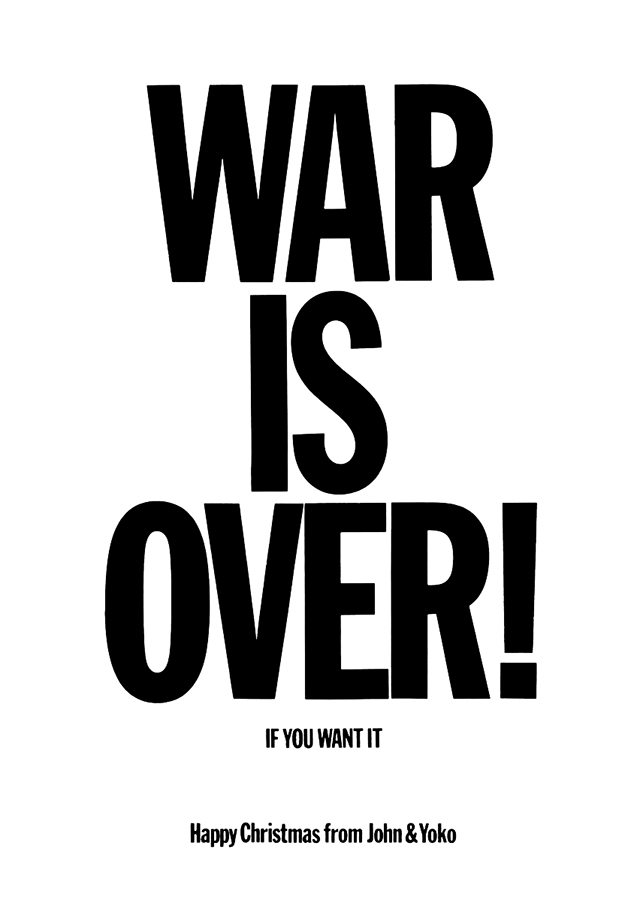
The design posted on billboards in 12 major cities by John Lennon and Yoko Ono

"Happy Xmas (War Is Over)" emerged from more than two years of peace activism by John Lennon and Yoko Ono, beginning with the bed-ins they held in March and May 1969 during their honeymoon. Its direct precursor was an international multimedia campaign launched in December 1969, at the height of the counterculture movement and widespread protests against American involvement in the Vietnam War. The campaign involved renting billboard space in 12 major cities to display black‑and‑white posters reading: "WAR IS OVER! If You Want It – Happy Christmas from John & Yoko". Although similar wording had appeared in the 1968 anti‑war songs "The War Is Over" by Phil Ochs and "The Unknown Soldier" by the Doors, there is no evidence that Lennon and Ono were influenced by these earlier works.

Reflecting on the accessibility that made his 1971 single "Imagine" more commercially successful than his other post‑Beatles releases, Lennon remarked: "Now I understand what you have to do: Put your political message across with a little honey." He conceived "Happy Xmas (War Is Over)" as a way to extend the themes of social unity and peaceful change through personal responsibility that had shaped the earlier billboard campaign, aiming to express optimism while avoiding the sentimentality he associated with many Christmas songs.

From 1963 to 1969, the Beatles issued special Christmas recordings to members of their fan club. After the group disbanded in 1970, Lennon became the first former member to release an original Christmas song. "Happy Xmas (War Is Over)" was later followed by George Harrison's "Ding Dong, Ding Dong" (1974), Paul McCartney's "Wonderful Christmastime" (1979), and Ringo Starr's album I Wanna Be Santa Claus (1999).

== Composition ==
The song opens with spoken Christmas greetings from Ono and Lennon to their children from previous marriages: Ono whispers "Happy Christmas, Kyoko", followed by Lennon whispering "Happy Christmas, Julian".

When Lennon first played his demo for Phil Spector, the producer noted that the opening line, "So this is Christmas...", shared a rhythmic pattern with the 1961 single "I Love How You Love Me" by the Paris Sisters, which Spector had produced. During the recording sessions, Lennon asked the guitarists to use mandolin‑style ostinato riffs reminiscent of those in "Try Some, Buy Some", a single produced earlier in 1971 by Spector and George Harrison for Spector's wife, Ronnie Spector, formerly of the Ronettes. Spector also added percussion instruments similar to those used on his 1963 album A Christmas Gift for You.

Beyond these borrowed elements, the chord progression and melodic structure of "Happy Xmas (War Is Over)" show similarities to the traditional English ballad "Skewball", though with a different rhythmic meter, later modulations, and a newly written chorus countermelody. The verses most closely resemble the 1963 rendition (titled "Stewball") by Peter, Paul and Mary.

== Recording ==
In late October 1971, with only a basic melody and partially developed lyrics, Lennon recorded an acoustic guitar demo of "Happy Xmas (War Is Over)" in his rooms at the St. Regis Hotel in New York City, where he and Ono were living. Ono later received co‑writing credit, although the extent of her contribution at this early stage is unclear, as she did not take part in the demo – an unusual circumstance for their collaborations. A second demo was made later in October after the couple moved into an apartment in Greenwich Village. Lennon again brought in Phil Spector to assist with production, as he had on Lennon's previous two albums, John Lennon/Plastic Ono Band and Imagine, the latter released in the US only weeks earlier.

The first recording session took place on the evening of 28 October at the Record Plant studio. After the session musicians – several of whom had previously worked with the Plastic Ono Band – recorded the basic instrumental track and overdubs, Lennon and Ono added their lead vocals. One of the four guitarists temporarily covered the bass part for Klaus Voormann, whose flight from Germany had been delayed. The following day, Ono and the session musicians, including Voormann, recorded the single's B‑side, "Listen, the Snow Is Falling". On the afternoon of 31 October, the Harlem Community Choir – 30 children aged between four and twelve – arrived at the studio to record backing vocals for the countermelody and sing‑along chorus. Photographs for the original sleeve were also taken during this session by Iain Macmillan.

== Release ==
Apple Records released "Happy Xmas (War Is Over)" and "Listen, the Snow Is Falling" in the United States on 1 December 1971 (Apple 1842). Issued as a 7‑inch single on transparent green vinyl with a card‑stock picture sleeve, the pressing appeared in two label variations, one of which displayed a sequence of five images showing Lennon's face gradually transforming into Ono's. This sequence had originally appeared on the reverse cover of the exhibition catalogue for Ono's career retrospective This Is Not Here, held in October 1971 at the Everson Museum of Art in Syracuse, New York.

A dispute between music publisher Northern Songs and Lennon over publishing rights delayed the UK release of "Happy Xmas (War Is Over)" until 24 November 1972 (Apple R 5870). The initial British pressing, issued as a 7‑inch single on opaque green vinyl with the picture sleeve and variant label, sold out quickly and was subsequently repressed on standard black vinyl.

The song first appeared on an album with Shaved Fish, the only compilation of Lennon's solo recordings released during his lifetime. On that album, "Happy Xmas" was paired with part of a live performance of "Give Peace a Chance", recorded as the finale of Lennon and Ono's One to One benefit concert on 30 August 1972. Designed by Roy Kohara, the album cover includes illustrations by Michael Bryan representing each track; for "Happy Xmas (War Is Over)", the image depicts an aeroplane dropping a Christmas ornament instead of a bomb.

Over the years, "Happy Xmas (War Is Over)" has been reissued in various single formats by Capitol, Geffen and Parlophone, sometimes in conjunction with the release of compilations of Lennon's work. It has also appeared on numerous Christmas music compilations, including entries in the Now That's What I Call Music! series.

A rough mix produced during the first recording session on 28 October 1971 was released in 1998 on the John Lennon Anthology.

== Music videos ==
A music video for "Happy Xmas (War Is Over)" was included on The John Lennon Video Collection, released on VHS in 1992 to accompany the 1989 reissue of The John Lennon Collection. It combines images from Lennon and Ono's 1969 "War Is Over!" billboard campaign with candid photographs of the couple and their son Sean from the late 1970s, intercut with footage of a boys' choral ensemble singing along with the original Harlem Community Choir vocals.

In 2003, a new Video on YouTube was produced for the remastered 5.1 version of the song included on the DVD Lennon Legend: The Very Best of John Lennon. This version has accumulated more than 22 million views on YouTube.

== Reception ==
On its US single debut in 1971, "Happy Xmas (War Is Over)" achieved only modest success. Its late release limited radio airplay before Christmas, and the single received little promotion. (Note: During this period, radio stations were generally reluctant to interrupt regular programming with Christmas music, and new Christmas songs were slow to gain acceptance. "Happy Xmas" was the second‑highest charting Christmas single in the US during the 1970s, behind the Eagles' version of "Please Come Home for Christmas".) The single peaked at number 36 on the Cash Box Top 100 Singles chart and number 28 on the Record World Singles Chart, and reached number 3 on the Billboard Christmas Singles chart. (Note: In years when Billboard published a Christmas Singles chart, Christmas releases were not listed on the Hot 100.) It later returned to the Billboard Christmas charts in 1972, 1983, 1984 and 1985. (Note: Billboard published a Christmas Singles chart from 1963 to 1972 and again from 1983 to 1985.) The song also reached number 32 on the Billboard Hot Adult Contemporary chart for the week ending 6 January 1996. Its most recent appearance on the Billboard Hot 100 came in 2022, when it peaked at number 38 for the week ending 31 December 2022.

"Happy Xmas (War Is Over)" was immediately successful in Britain upon its release in November 1972. It reached number 4 on the UK Singles Chart and number 10 on the chart compiled by Melody Maker. Since then, it has re‑entered the UK Singles Chart nine additional times. Its most notable return followed Lennon's death on 8 December 1980, when the single rose to number 2 – behind a reissued "Imagine" – and remained on the chart for nine weeks.

Between December 1972 and February 1973, the song entered the top ten in Australia, Belgium, Denmark, France, Ireland, the Netherlands, Norway and Singapore.

Ultimate Classic Rock critic Nick DeRiso ranked the song as Lennon's fifth‑greatest solo political work, writing that "Lennon took the opportunity to encourage Yuletide revelers toward a broader sense of pacifism."

== Other versions ==
In 1985, Australian group the Incredible Penguins released a version of the song that peaked at number 10 on the Australian singles chart in December 1985.

In later decades, "Happy Xmas (War Is Over)" gained a higher profile in the cultural mainstream as more artists recorded their own versions, most of them released after 2000. Two of these recordings entered the Billboard charts in the same year. The first, released on 17 October 2006 by Canadian singer‑songwriter Sarah McLachlan on her album Wintersong, became the year's best‑selling Christmas album and received a Grammy nomination. It includes backing vocals from the Children's and Youth Choirs of the Music Outreach Program at the Sarah McLachlan School of Music in Vancouver, British Columbia. The track entered the Billboard Adult Contemporary chart at number 22 for the week ending 9 December 2006 and reached a peak of number 5 four weeks later.

The second charting version, released on 12 December 2006 by American rock band The Fray as a digital download, debuted at number 50 on the Billboard Hot 100 and number 41 on the Pop 100 for the week ending 31 December 2006, remaining on both charts for one additional week.

Some of the earliest other recordings of "Happy Xmas (War Is Over)" appeared on holiday albums by major pop artists, including I Still Believe in Santa Claus (1990) by Andy Williams, The Christmas Album (1992) by Neil Diamond, A Very Special Season (1994) by Diana Ross, and These Are Special Times (1998) by Celine Dion.

Other notable versions include a 1991 recording on the album Standards by The Alarm, a 1994 live performance by Melissa Etheridge, and a 1995 Brazilian version by Simone. Additional recordings include the 2002 version by South African band Toxic Shame, the 2002 Maybe This Christmas version by Sense Field, and a 2005 cover by American pop rock band Maroon 5 in support of Amnesty International's Make Some Noise campaign.

Australian singer Delta Goodrem recorded the song as a B‑side to her single Predictable. Shinedown released a "Holiday Version" in 2006, and the mash‑up band Beatallica included their rendition on the 2009 album Winter Plunderband. On 13 December 2012, Sean Lennon performed the song with gospel singer Mavis Staples, Jeff Tweedy of Wilco, and the Harlem Gospel Choir on The Colbert Report. The performance was made available on iTunes to raise funds for Hurricane Sandy disaster relief. During John Lennon's 75th Birthday Concert, Sheryl Crow, Aloe Blacc and Peter Frampton performed the song with a children's chorus from The Stuttering Association for the Youth.

On 14 December 2018, Miley Cyrus and Mark Ronson recorded a version of the song with Lennon's son Sean Ono Lennon. The three performed it on the 15 December 2018 episode of Saturday Night Live, where Ronson and Cyrus were the musical guests.

In November 2019, John Legend released a new version of the song, with string arrangements by Matt Jones and an improvised solo by violinist Scott Tixier. It reached number nine on the UK Singles Chart. The song was also covered in late 2019 by HimeHina Virtual YouTuber performers Hime Tanaka and Hina Suzuki.

A French‑language version titled "Noël Des Enfants" was recorded by René Simard and his sister Nathalie for René's album 18 ans déjà.

== Personnel ==
- John Lennon – vocals, guitar, producer
- Yoko Ono – vocals, producer
- The Harlem Community Choir – backing vocals, children's choir
- May Pang – backing vocals
- Nicky Hopkins – piano, chimes, glockenspiel
- Teddy Irwin – guitar
- Jim Keltner – drums, sleigh bells
- Hugh McCracken – guitar
- Chris Osbourne – guitar
- Stuart Scharf – guitar
- Roy Cicala – recording engineer
- Phil Spector – producer

== Chart performance ==
=== Original version ===
Chart performance
Chart (1971–2025)	Peak position
Australia (ARIA)	13
Austria (Ö3 Austria Top 40)	6
Belgium (Ultratop 50 Flanders)	4
Canada Hot 100 (Billboard)	24
Canada (Nielsen SoundScan)	16
Canada Top Singles (RPM)	43
Croatia International Christmas Airplay (Top lista)	10
Czech Republic Airplay (ČNS IFPI)	25
Czech Republic Singles Digital (ČNS IFPI)	13
Denmark (Tracklisten)	15
Europe (European Hot 100 Singles)	55
Finland (Suomen virallinen lista)	14
France (SNEP)	41
Germany (GfK)	6
Greece International (IFPI) 2010 digital remaster	20
Global 200 (Billboard)	18
Hungary (Editors' Choice Top 40)	39
Hungary (Single Top 40)	23
Hungary (Stream Top 40)	11
Ireland (IRMA)	2
Italy (FIMI)	6
Japan Top Singles Sales (Billboard Japan)	31
Japan (Oricon)	29
Latvia Streaming (LaIPA)	12
Lithuania (AGATA)	22
Luxembourg (Radio Luxembourg)	1
Luxembourg (Billboard)	15
Netherlands (Dutch Top 40)	6
Netherlands (Single Top 100)	2
New Zealand (Recorded Music NZ)	10
Norway (VG-lista)	3
Poland Airplay (ZPAV)	46
Poland (Polish Streaming Top 100)	41
Portugal (AFP)	37
Scottish Singles Sales (Official Charts)	66
Slovakia Airplay (ČNS IFPI)	8
Slovakia Singles Digital (ČNS IFPI)	10
Slovenia (SloTop50)	3
Spain (PROMUSICAE)	89
Sweden (Sverigetopplistan)	11
Switzerland (Schweizer Hitparade)	10
UK Singles (OCC)	2
US Billboard Hot 100	38
US Cash Box Top 100	36
US Holiday 100 (Billboard)	9
US Record World Singles Chart	28
US Rolling Stone Top 100	73

=== Celine Dion version ===
Chart performance
Chart (2006–2025)	Peak position
Estonia Airplay (TopHit)	56
Italy (FIMI)	32
Lithuania (AGATA)	86
Netherlands (Single Top 100)	76
Poland (Polish Airplay Top 100)	23
Poland (Polish Streaming Top 100)	53
Portugal (AFP)	139
Sweden (Sverigetopplistan)	30
Switzerland (Schweizer Hitparade)	70
US Holiday 100 (Billboard)	32

=== Maroon 5 version ===
Chart performance
Chart (2007–2015)	Peak position
Canada (Canadian Digital Song Sales)	36
US Holiday 100 (Billboard)	37

=== Miley Cyrus and Mark Ronson feat. Sean Ono Lennon version ===
Chart performance
Chart (2018–2019)	Peak position
Austria (Ö3 Austria Top 40)	59
Germany (GfK)	46
Sweden (Sverigetopplistan)	99
Switzerland (Schweizer Hitparade)	100
US Holiday Digital Song Sales (Billboard)	7

=== John Legend version ===
Chart performance
Chart (2019–2021)	Peak position
UK Singles (Official Charts)	9
US Billboard Hot 100	69
US Adult Contemporary (Billboard)	15
US Holiday 100 (Billboard)	45
US Rolling Stone Top 100	36

== Certifications ==
=== John Lennon version ===
Certifications
Region	Certification	Certified units/sales
Australia (ARIA)	2× Platinum	140,000^{‡}
Denmark (IFPI Danmark)	2× Platinum	180,000^{‡}
Germany (BVMI)	Platinum	500,000^{‡}
Italy (FIMI) sales since 2009	2× Platinum	200,000^{‡}
Japan (RIAJ) digital sales 2005-2017	Gold	100,000^{*}
New Zealand (RMNZ)	Platinum	30,000^{‡}
Portugal (AFP)	Gold	20,000^{‡}
United Kingdom (BPI)	3× Platinum	1,800,000^{‡}
Streaming
Greece (IFPI Greece) 2010 digital remaster	Gold	1,000,000^{†}
^{*} Sales figures based on certification alone.^{‡} Sales+streaming figures based on certification alone.^{†} Streaming-only figures based on certification alone.

=== Celine Dion version ===
Certifications
Region	Certification	Certified units/sales
Denmark (IFPI Danmark)	Gold	45,000^{‡}
Italy (FIMI)	Gold	50,000^{‡}
United Kingdom (BPI)	Silver	200,000^{‡}
^{‡} Sales+streaming figures based on certification alone.

=== John Legend version ===
Certifications
Region	Certification	Certified units/sales
United States (RIAA)	Gold	500,000^{‡}
^{‡} Sales+streaming figures based on certification alone.

== See also ==
- List of anti-war songs
- "The War Is Over", 1968 Phil Ochs song

== Sources ==
- Badman, Keith (2001). The Beatles Diary Volume 2: After the Break-Up 1970–2001. London: Omnibus Press. ISBN 978-0-7119-8307-6.
- "Pogues Track Wins Christmas Poll". BBC News: Entertainment. London, UK: BBC. 16 December 2004.
- "Happy Xmas (War Is Over)". The Beatles Bible. Cardiff, Wales, UK: Joe Pepper. 2010.
- Blaney, John (June 2005). John Lennon: Listen to This Book. London, UK: Paper Jukebox. ISBN 978-0-9544528-1-0.
- "Cash Box Top 100 Singles: The week ending 1 January 1972". "Cash Box" Archives: The Legendary "Cash Box" Magazine Charts. Ridgeway, SC: Cash Box Magazine. 2012. Archived from the original on 13 December 2010.
- Castleman, Harry; Podrazik, Walter J. (1976). All Together Now: The First Complete Beatles Discography 1961–1975. New York, NY: Ballantine Books. ISBN 0-345-25680-8.
- Christman, Ed (3 November 2007). Werde, Bill (ed.). "Jingle All the Way: Holiday Cheer". Billboard. Vol. 119, no. 44. New York City, NY. p. 32. ISSN 0006-2510.
- De Zutter, Bastien (23 November 2012). "Song: Happy Xmas (War Is Over)". Second Hand Songs. Brussels, BE.
- Gilmore, Mikal (15 December 2005). Dana, Will (ed.). "Lennon Lives Forever". Rolling Stone. No. 989. New York City, NY. pp. 56–66. ISSN 0035-791X.
- Greene, Andy (30 November 2011). "Readers' Poll: The Best Christmas Songs of All Time". Rolling Stone. New York City, NY.
- Holdsworth, Sam, ed. (21 December 1985). "1985 Christmas Hits". Billboard. Vol. 97, no. 51. New York City, NY. p. 57. ISSN 0006-2510.
- Jackson, Andrew Grant (July 2012). Still the Greatest: The Essential Songs of The Beatles' Solo Careers. Lanham, MD: Scarecrow Press. ISBN 978-0-8108-8222-5.
- Kruse, Robert J. (December 2009). "Geographies of John and Yoko's 1969 Campaign for Peace—An Intersection of Celebrity, Space, Art, and Activism". In Johansson, Ola & Bell, Thomas L (eds.). Sound, Society and the Geography of Popular Music. Farnham, Surrey, UK: Ashgate Publishing. pp. 11–32. ISBN 978-0-7546-7577-8.
- Lynskey, Dorian (April 2011). "Chapter 8: Plastic Ono Band, 'Give Peace a Chance'". 33 Revolutions per Minute: A History of Protest Songs, from Billie Holiday to Green Day. New York City, NY: Ecco Press. pp. 126–142. ISBN 978-0-06-167015-2.
- Madinger, Chip; Easter, Mark (2000). Eight Arms to Hold You: The Solo Beatles Compendium. Chesterfield, MO: 44.1 Productions. ISBN 0-615-11724-4.
- "Artists–John Lennon: Singles". Official Charts Company. London, UK: The Official UK Charts Company. 2012.
- Sheff, David (December 2000) [1981]. All We Are Saying: The Last Major Interview with John Lennon and Yoko Ono. New York City, NY: St. Martin's Griffin. ISBN 978-0-312-25464-3.
- Spizer, Bruce (2005). The Beatles Solo on Apple Records. New Orleans, LA: 498 Productions. ISBN 0-9662649-5-9.
- Tillekens, Ger (September 1998). Knot, Hans (ed.). "Baroque and Folk and... John Lennon: Some folk and classical elements in the songs of John Lennon". Soundscapes: Journal on Media Culture. 1 (Summer 1998). Groningen, NL. ISSN 1567-7745. Archived from the original on 21 November 2011.
- Werde, Bill, ed. (6 January 2007). "Billboard Charts". Billboard. Vol. 119, no. 1. New York City, NY. pp. 43–62. ISSN 0006-2510.
- Whitburn, Joel (June 2004). Joel Whitburn's Top Pop Singles 1955–2002 (10th ed.). Menomonee Falls, WI: Record Research. ISBN 978-0-89820-155-0.
- White, Adam, ed. (22 December 1984). "1984 Christmas Hits". Billboard. Vol. 96, no. 51. New York City, NY. p. 8. ISSN 0006-2510.
- White, Timothy, ed. (6 January 1996). "Hot Adult Contemporary". Billboard. Vol. 108, no. 1. New York City, NY. p. 84. ISSN 0006-2510.
- Wiener, Jon (January 1991). Come Together: John Lennon in His Time. Champaign, IL: University of Illinois Press. ISBN 978-0-252-06131-8.
- Williams, Richard (13 December 2011). "John Lennon: "I was sick of 'White Christmas'" – A classic interview from the vaults". Guardian Culture: Music—From Rock's Backpages. London, UK: The Guardian.
- Zhito, Lee & Ackerman, Paul, eds. (25 December 1971). "Best Bets for Christmas". Billboard. Vol. 83, no. 52. Los Angeles, CA. p. 49. ISSN 0006-2510.
- Zhito, Lee & Ackerman, Paul, eds. (23 December 1972). "Best Bets for Christmas". Billboard. Vol. 84, no. 52. Los Angeles, CA. p. 4. ISSN 0006-2510.
