= Who Has Seen the Wind? (song) =

Song by Yoko Ono

Single by Yoko Ono & Plastic Ono Band
- A-side: "Instant Karma!" (John Lennon & Plastic Ono Band)
- Released: 6 February 1970
- Recorded: January 1970
- Studio: Trident Studios, London
- Length: 2:02
- Label: Apple
- Songwriter: Yoko Ono
- Producer: John Lennon

"Who Has Seen the Wind?" is a song written by Yoko Ono that first appeared as the B-side of John Lennon's single "Instant Karma!" It was later issued as a bonus track on a compact disc version of the Wedding Album.

The song was released on digital and streaming services in 2022 via Secretly Canadian.

== Origin and recording ==
"Who Has Seen the Wind?" was recorded at Trident Studios in London in January 1970 with Lennon serving as the producer. Ono developed the song out of instruction pieces, i.e., instructional poems, she had created earlier. The first verse was taken from a poem by 19th-century poet Christina Rossetti:

Who has seen the wind?
Neither you nor I:
But when the trees bow down their heads,

The wind is passing by.

== Music and lyrics ==
Beatle biographer John Blaney describes "Who Has Seen the Wind?" as a "gentle acoustic ballad". Music lecturers Ben Urish and Ken Bielen describe it as a "low-key, evocative number". The song starts out with Ono singing a capella. When the backing instruments join, they include Lennon on guitar, Ono on flute or recorder and John Barham on harpsichord & tambourine. Beatle historian Bruce Spizer and some other sources speculate that George Harrison may have also played guitar on the song. Spizer describes the feel of the song as evoking "images of minstrels performing at a Renaissance fair". Music critic Johnny Rogan similarly considers the song to have "parlour music ambience seemingly intended to transport the listener into a different musical age". Music journalist Peter Doggett describes Ono's vocal performance as "child-like" and "innocent". Fab Four FAQ authors Stuart Shea and Robert Rodriguez describe it as illustrating the "mellow side" of Ono, also stating that the song "would have fit in well in an Addams Family soundtrack".

Doggett considers the theme of "Who Has Seen the Wind?" to be "a message of love, linked to Yoko's belief that we are all wind, all clouds in the sky, drifting in search of meaning". According to Blaney, Ono's "Listen, the Snow Is Falling", written the following year, has a similar theme involving natural elements having the power to connect people. Music journalist John Kruth states that the lyrics "evoked the imagery of a Victorian-era poet". Billboard contributor Morgan Enos considers the song to be a "faux-medieval love song".

According to Ono biographer Jerry Hopkins, in an interview with Rolling Stone magazine's Jonathan Cott, Ono stated of the song that "There was something 'of a little lost girl about it,' a sense of 'quiet desperation.'" Cott reacted that "religion, a philosopher once said, was what you do with your aloneness ... or, one might add, with your pain and desperation. Yoko's music pushes pain into a kind of invigorating and liberating energy, just as a stutterer finally gives birth to a difficult word, since it existed originally at the fine edge between inaudibility and the sound of waves of dreams."

== Release and reception ==
The label to the single says to "Play Soft" (or in some versions to "Play Quiet"). This contrasts with the A-side of the single, "Instant Karma!", whose label says to "Play Loud". On Lennon and Ono's previous single, "Cold Turkey" / "Don't Worry Kyoko (Mummy's Only Looking for Her Hand in the Snow)", both sides exhorted the listener to "Play Loud".

In their book The Beatles: An Illustrated Record, NME critics Roy Carr and Tony Tyler remark that "Who Has Seen the Wind?" "would have made a marvellous soundtrack for the movie of Henry James' 'The Turn of the Screw', being a somewhat sinister ditty sung à la Wunderkind". Bruce Spizer deems the 1970 single "a far cry ... and welcome relief from the avant-garde discs issued by John and Yoko in 1969".

"Who Has Seen the Wind?" was released as a bonus track the 2007 CD release of the Wedding Album.
