= Rockin'1000 =

Italian musical supergroup

The Rockin'1000 is a musical project, originally created in Cesena (FC), Italy. Over a thousand musicians play and sing simultaneously at their concerts, with setlists composed mainly from well known rock music from different decades. The group was originally assembled in July 2015 as a way to ask the Foo Fighters to visit the town of Cesena, Italy. Originally organized in a crowdfunding effort by Fabio Zaffagnini, the Rockin'1000 have made several subsequent appearances, and have been dubbed the "biggest band in the world". Their initial performance in 2015 was made under the direction of Marco Sabiu.

Rockin'1000 have been reassembled for some subsequent performances. The project always have musicians from previous concerts, and open spots for new members, in each city. On 7 July 2019, Rockin'1000 played 18 songs in the Commerzbank Arena in Frankfurt, Germany. With 1,002 musicians playing in front of an audience of 15,000 spectators, the project achieved the world record for the largest performing rock band. Hundreds of guitarists, bass players, drummers, keyboardists, and singers—as well as wind sections, and string sections—joined together, playing rock classics by Deep Purple, Led Zeppelin, AC/DC, Jimi Hendrix, the Rolling Stones, Oasis, Depeche Mode and others.

In reaction to the Russian invasion of Ukraine, the group was enlisted to perform John Lennon's "Give Peace a Chance" for the opening of the final of the Eurovision Song Contest 2022 in Turin. The performance was pre-recorded in Piazza San Carlo, and was later continued by the live audience at the PalaOlimpico singing along, supported by the contest's co-presenters Alessandro Cattelan and Mika.

On 1 October 2022, Rockin'1000 performed on Allianz Parque in São Paulo in front of an audience of more than 30,000 spectators, on their first concert in South America. Among the performers there were musicians from previous concerts and new members from Brazil. Artists such as Supla and Sérgio Dias were invited to participate and host the concert.
