= Working Class Hero =

1970 song by John Lennon

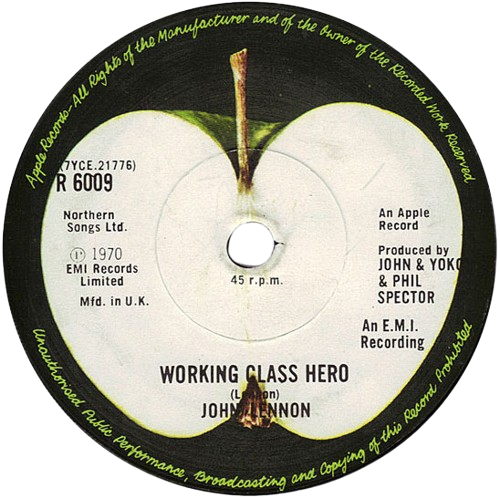
- UK B-side label

Song by John Lennon

from the album John Lennon/Plastic Ono Band
- Released: 11 December 1970
- Recorded: 27 September 1970
- Studio: EMI Studios, London
- Genre: Folk
- Length: 3:48
- Label: Apple
- Songwriter: John Lennon
- Producers: John Lennon; Yoko Ono; Phil Spector

"Working Class Hero" is a song by John Lennon from his 1970 album John Lennon/Plastic Ono Band, his first album after the break-up of the Beatles. It was released as the B-side to the single "Imagine" in Britain on 24 October 1975.

== Theme ==
Stridently political, the song is a commentary on the difference between social classes. According to Lennon, it is about working class people being processed into the middle classes, into the "machine". Lennon also said, "I think it's a revolutionary song – it's really just revolutionary. I just think its concept is revolutionary. I hope it's for workers and not for tarts and fags. I hope it's about what "Give Peace a Chance" was about. But I don't know – on the other hand, it might just be ignored. I think it's for the people like me who are working class, who are supposed to be processed into the middle classes, or into the machinery. It's my experience, and I hope it's just a warning to people, Working Class Hero."

The song continued a string of political Lennon recordings that began in 1968 with the Beatles' "Revolution" and continued in 1972 with the release of Some Time in New York City.

== Recording and sound ==
Recorded at EMI Studios on 27 September 1970, the song features only Lennon, singing and playing an acoustic guitar as his backing. The chord progression is very simple, and builds on A-minor and G-major, with a short detour to D-major in one line of the chorus. Lennon's strumming technique includes a riff with a hammer-on pick of the E note on the D string and then an open A string. The tone and style of the song is similar to that of "Masters of War" and "North Country Blues" by Bob Dylan, a known influence of Lennon. Both are based on Jean Ritchie's arrangement of the traditional English folk song "Nottamun Town".

According to tape operator Andy Stephens, the song took more than 100 takes to record. The recording is the composite of two different takes: the tone of the guitar and vocal changes between 1:24 and 1:45 for the verse "When they've tortured and scared you".

== Reception ==
Classic Rock critic Rob Hughes rated "Working Class Hero" as Lennon's fourth best political song, saying that "The class wars provide the impetus for Lennon’s searing commentary on the repressive nature of institutional power." Ultimate Classic Rock critic Nick DeRiso rated it as Lennon's fourth greatest solo political song, calling it "one of Lennon's most brutally frank and emotionally gripping moments."

Stereogum contributors Timothy and Elizabeth Bracy rated it as Lennon's third best solo song, calling it "a stark, acoustic ballad reminiscent of Bob Dylan's 'Masters of War'" and "a painful recognition that the Age of Aquarius has meant less than zero."

== Controversy ==
In 1973, US Representative Harley Orrin Staggers heard the song – which includes the lines "'Til you're so fucking crazy you can't follow their rules" and "But you're still fucking peasants as far as I can see" – on WGTB and lodged a complaint with the Federal Communications Commission (FCC). The manager of the station, Ken Sleeman, faced a year in prison and a $10,000 fine, but defended his decision to play the song saying, "The People of Washington DC are sophisticated enough to accept the occasional four-letter word in context, and not become sexually aroused, offended, or upset." The charges were dropped. Other US radio stations, like Boston's WBCN, banned the song for its use of the word "fucking". In Australia, the album was released with the expletive removed from the song and the lyrics censored on the inner sleeve. The American release did not censor the lyrics, neither on the album nor on the inner sleeve.

== Personnel ==
- John Lennon – vocals, acoustic guitar
