= Richard Williams (journalist) =

British music and sports journalist (born 1947)

- Born: 13 March 1947 (age 79)
- Occupations: Music and sports journalist
- Website: thebluemoment.com

Richard Williams (born 13 March 1947) is a British music and sports journalist.

== Career ==
As a writer, then deputy editor, of the weekly music newspaper Melody Maker (MM), he became an influential commentator on the rise of new forms of rock music at the end of the 1960s. Williams and MM, as it was known, helped promote and contextualise the progressive in pop music. In particular, Williams wrote several key articles around 1970 that increased UK attention to the (then disintegrating) Velvet Underground. Melody Maker still covered jazz and Williams wrote about the more progressive developments in this field also.

The magazine's serious approach to rock music and culture, under the editorship of Ray Coleman, secured MM a huge circulation by the close of the 1960s and the start of the 1970s. It left New Musical Express, a more pop-orientated weekly, in its wake as MM caught the mood of rock followers at a time when the music had transcended its Top 40 roots to become a powerful symbol of social and cultural change.

Williams moved on to new challenges in the early 1970s. Beginning in May 1970 he contributed to The Times and continued to write for that paper until October 1989. He also wrote regularly for Radio Times. He left journalism to join Island Records' A&R department in 1973, becoming department head. For two years, he signed and developed artists including Pete Wingfield, Stone Delight, Bryn Haworth and John Cale.

The first presenter of the BBC rock show The Old Grey Whistle Test (launched in 1971) while still a member of the MM team, and shortly thereafter its producer, Williams later became editor of the new London listings guide Time Out and returned to MM as editor from 1978 to 1980.

After a period as features editor at The Sunday Times, he became editor of the Independent on Sunday's Sunday Review. His music journalism has been gathered in the volume Long Distance Call: Writings on Music and biographies of Bob Dylan (A Man Called Alias), Miles Davis (The Man in the Green Shirt), and Phil Spector (Out of His Head) are among his list of other publications.

Williams remains an active journalist and was the chief sports writer of The Guardian, covering a full array of sports, until 2013. He has written several books on Formula One, including The Death of Ayrton Senna, Racers (an analysis of the main participants of the 1996 F1 season), Enzo Ferrari: A Life, and The Last Road Race (a study of the changing balance in Formula One between British and Italian teams, using the 1957 Pescara Grand Prix as the backdrop).

Williams' comments about music and related film, photography and art topics are published in the form of his blog, The Blue Moment.

He was director of the Berlin Jazz Festival from 2015 to 2017.

== Bibliography ==
- Out of His Head: The Sound of Phil Spector (1972)
- Bob Dylan: A Man Called Alias (1990)
- Long Distance Call: Writings on Music (2000)
- The Blue Moment: Miles Davis’s Kind of Blue and the Remaking of Modern Music (Faber, 2009)
- A Race with Love and Death: The Story of Richar Seaman (2020)
- The Boy: Stirling Moss: Life in 60 Laps (2021)
- 24 Hours: 100 Years of Le Mans (2023)
