= Mother (John Lennon song) =

- US picture sleeve

Single by John Lennon

from the album John Lennon/Plastic Ono Band
- B-side: "Why" (Yoko Ono)
- Released: 28 December 1970 (US only)
- Recorded: September–October 1970
- Genre: Rock
- Length: 5:34 (album version); 3:53 (single edit)
- Songwriter: John Lennon
- Producers: Phil Spector, John Lennon and Yoko Ono

John Lennon singles chronology
"Instant Karma!" (1970)	"Mother" (1970)	"Power to the People" (1971)

"Mother" is a song by the English musician John Lennon, first released on his 1970 album John Lennon/Plastic Ono Band. An edited version of the song was issued as a single in the United States on Apple Records, on 28 December 1970. The single edit runs 1:41 shorter than the album due to its quicker fade-out and removal of the tolling bells that start the song. The B-side features "Why" by Yoko Ono. The song peaked in the United States at number 19 on the Cashbox Top 100 and number 43 on the Billboard Hot 100. In Canada the song reached number 12.

== Conception ==
The lyrics of "Mother" address both of Lennon's parents, each of whom abandoned him in his childhood. His father, Alf, left the family when Lennon was an infant. His mother, Julia, did not live with her son, although they had a good relationship; she was killed in a car accident on 15 July 1958 by an off-duty policeman named Eric Clague when Lennon was 17. In one of his last concerts, Lennon stated that the song was not just about his parents, but was rather "about 99% of the parents, alive or half dead".

"Mother" opens the album, starting with a funeral bell tolling slowly, four times. The song ends with Lennon repeating the phrase "Mama don't go, daddy come home", each time increasing in intensity until he screams the line as the song fades out.

Lennon was inspired to write the song after undergoing primal therapy with Arthur Janov, originally at his home at Tittenhurst Park and then at the Primal Institute, California, where he remained for four months. Lennon, who eventually derided Janov, initially described the therapy as "something more important to me than The Beatles".

Although Lennon said that "Mother" was the song that "seemed to catch in my head," he had doubts about its commercial appeal and he considered issuing "Love" as a single instead. In November 1982, a remixed version of "Love" was released as a single to help promote The John Lennon Collection LP.

An early version of "Mother" performed on an electric guitar by Lennon can be heard on the John Lennon Anthology box set.

The unused take 91 of the song was featured in the final scene and credits of the 2009 John Lennon biographical film, Nowhere Boy.

A live version of the song was released Live in New York City from his 30 August 1972 concert at Madison Square Garden.

== Reception ==
Cash Box said of the single version that "spare production work and a powerful melancholy vocal give the [song] its disturbing brilliance." Record World said that the "mix of psychology and Spectorsound is depressing and dynamic at once." Billboard called it a "slow rock emotion ballad" with a "compelling, biting lyric line."

Stereogum contributors Timothy and Elizabeth Bracy rated it as Lennon's 4th best solo song, saying that "Over a martial beat and insistent piano riff, the question rises inextricably: if we can be abandoned by those who made us, who in the hell can we trust? The screaming, unanswered fade out makes the answer only too clear." Far Out critic Joe Taysom described it as "one of the most moving creations that the late musician ever concocted," saying that Lennon "lays himself emotionally bare and finally deals with the abandonment issues that scarred him from childhood."

== Personnel ==
The musicians who performed on the original recording were as follows:

- John Lennon – double-tracked vocals, guitars, piano
- Yoko Ono – wind
- Ringo Starr – drums
- Klaus Voormann – bass guitar

Lennon plays guitar rather than piano on the Nowhere Boy demo version.

== Other versions ==
- Barbra Streisand recorded "Mother" (as well as Lennon's "Love") on her 1971 album Barbra Joan Streisand; it was also released as a single. Record World said of it that Streisand "takes this intensely personal John Lennon lyric and makes it her own." The single reached #74 in Canada. Streisand's version also peaked at #79 in the US.
- Shigesato Itoi, creator of the Mother video game series, stated in an interview that this song was in large part the inspiration for his naming of the series.
- Mia Martini recorded in 1972 this song in Italian, with the title literally translated as "Madre".
- Maynard Ferguson recorded the song on his 1972 album M.F. Horn Two.
- South African artist Ratau Mike Makhalemele covered the song on an EP of Lennon covers in 1990.
- Shelby Lynne covered this song on her 2001 album Love, Shelby.
- Christina Aguilera covered the song in 2007 for the benefit album Instant Karma: The Amnesty International Campaign to Save Darfur.
- Folk artist Jackie Oates included a version of the song on her 2018 album The Joy of Living.
- Lou Reed covered the song several times live featuring electric guitars and violins.
- David Bowie recorded the song as a demo, posthumously released on 8 January 2021.
- Australian Punk band X recorded the song and released it as a single in 1984. The music video featured lead singer Steve Lucas covered in clay that cracked and peeled as he sang the song, suggesting the idea of being born.

== Sales ==
Sales for Mother
Region	Sales
South Africa	25,000

== See also ==
- "My Mummy's Dead", another song by Lennon
