= Power to the People (song) =

1971 song written by John Lennon

- US picture sleeve

Single by John Lennon/Plastic Ono Band
- B-side: "Open Your Box" (UK) (Yoko Ono); "Touch Me" (US) (Yoko Ono)
- Released: 12 March 1971 (UK); 22 March 1971 (US)
- Recorded: 22 January – 9 February 1971
- Studio: Ascot Sound, Berkshire
- Genre: Rock, protest song
- Length: 3:15
- Label: Apple
- Songwriter: John Lennon
- Producers: Phil Spector; John Lennon; Yoko Ono

John Lennon/Plastic Ono Band singles chronology
"Mother" (1970)	"Power to the People" (1971)	"Imagine" (1971)

"Power to the People" is a song written by John Lennon, released as a single in 1971, credited to John Lennon/Plastic Ono Band. It was issued on Apple Records (catalogue number R5892 in the United Kingdom, 1830 in the United States) and charted at number 6 on the British singles chart, at number 10 on the Cashbox Top 100, and at number 11 on the Billboard Hot 100 The song's first appearance on album was the 1975 compilation Shaved Fish.

== Writing and recording ==
"Power to the People" was recorded at Ascot Sound Studios on 15 February 1971, during sessions that would produce songs for Lennon's Imagine album. The single was released on 12 March 1971 in the UK and 22 March 1971 in the US (although some sources give the British release as 8 March). The song was written by Lennon in response to an interview he gave to Tariq Ali and Robin Blackburn, published in Red Mole (8–22 March 1971). As Lennon explained: "I just felt inspired by what they said, although a lot of it is gobbledygook. So I wrote 'Power to the People' the same way I wrote 'Give Peace a Chance,' as something for the people to sing. I make singles like broadsheets. It was another quickie, done at Ascot."

It entered the charts on 20 March 1971, and remained there for nine weeks. It was Lennon's fifth solo single, the Plastic Ono Band on this occasion comprising Lennon, Bobby Keys and Billy Preston in addition to regulars Klaus Voormann and Alan White. Backing vocals were supplied by Rosetta Hightower and "44 others". The singers also stomped their feet to make it sound more like a political rally. Phil Spector, Lennon and Yoko Ono were credited as producers.

Record World called it a "a fantastic choral chant-song that really rocks."

Lennon's regard for the song changed during the 1970s. In Skywriting by Word of Mouth, he called the song "rather embarrassing" and supported Hunter S. Thompson's claim that the anthem was "ten years too late". In 1980, he stated that the song "didn't really come off" as it had been "written in the state of being asleep and wanting to be loved by Tariq Ali and his ilk".

Ultimate Classic Rock critic Nick DeRiso rated it as Lennon's 6th greatest solo political song, calling it "one of Lennon's funkiest and hardest-hitting musical achievements."

== Cover versions and other uses of the song ==
The Minus 5 recorded a version of "Power to the People" for the 1995 tribute album Working Class Hero: A Tribute to John Lennon. In 2000, Eric Burdon, Billy Preston and Ringo Starr recorded the song for Steal This Movie!, a film about Abbie Hoffman.

The song has been used as a theme song of the 2016 and 2020 US presidential campaigns of Bernie Sanders and his Fighting Oligarchy tour.

Bruce Springsteen along with Tom Morello and others performed the song on January 30, 2026 at Morello's "Defend Minnesota" benefit concert in Minneapolis which was held in response to President Donald Trump and the killing of civilian protesters Renée Good and Alex Pretti by federal ICE agents during Operation Metro Surge.

== Personnel ==
The musicians who performed on "Power to the People" were as follows:

- John Lennon - vocals, electric guitar, piano
- Klaus Voormann - bass guitar
- Bobby Keys - saxophone
- Jim Gordon - drums
- Doris Troy, Madeline Bell, Nanette Workman, Rosetta Hightower and others - backing vocals

== Chart history ==
=== Weekly charts ===
Chart (1971)	Peak position
Australia (Kent Music Report)	21
Canada RPM Top Singles	4
Germany	7
Ireland (IRMA)	7
Italy (Musica e Dischi)	15
Japan	66
Netherlands (Single Top 100)	5
Norway	3
Switzerland	5
UK	7
US Billboard Hot 100	11
US Cash Box Top 100	10

=== Year-end charts ===
Chart (1971)	Rank
Canada	71
Netherlands (Dutch Top 40)	88
US (Joel Whitburn's Pop Annual)	99
