= Give Peace a Chance =

1969 anti-war song written by John Lennon

Single by Plastic Ono Band
- B-side: "Remember Love" (Yoko Ono)
- Released: 4 July 1969
- Recorded: 1 June 1969
- Venue: Queen Elizabeth Hotel, Montreal
- Length: 4:54
- Label: Apple
- Songwriter: John Lennon (originally credited to Lennon–McCartney)
- Producers: John Lennon; Yoko Ono; André Perry

Plastic Ono Band singles chronology
"Give Peace a Chance" (1969)	"Cold Turkey" (1969)

"Give Peace a Chance" is an anti-war song written by John Lennon (originally credited to Lennon–McCartney), and recorded with the participation of a small group of friends in a performance with Yoko Ono in a hotel room in Montreal, Quebec, Canada. Released as a single in July 1969 by the Plastic Ono Band on Apple Records, it is the first solo single issued by Lennon, released while he was still a member of the Beatles, and became an anthem of the American anti-war movement during the 1970s. It peaked at number 14 on the Billboard Hot 100 and number 2 on the British singles chart.

== Writing and recording ==
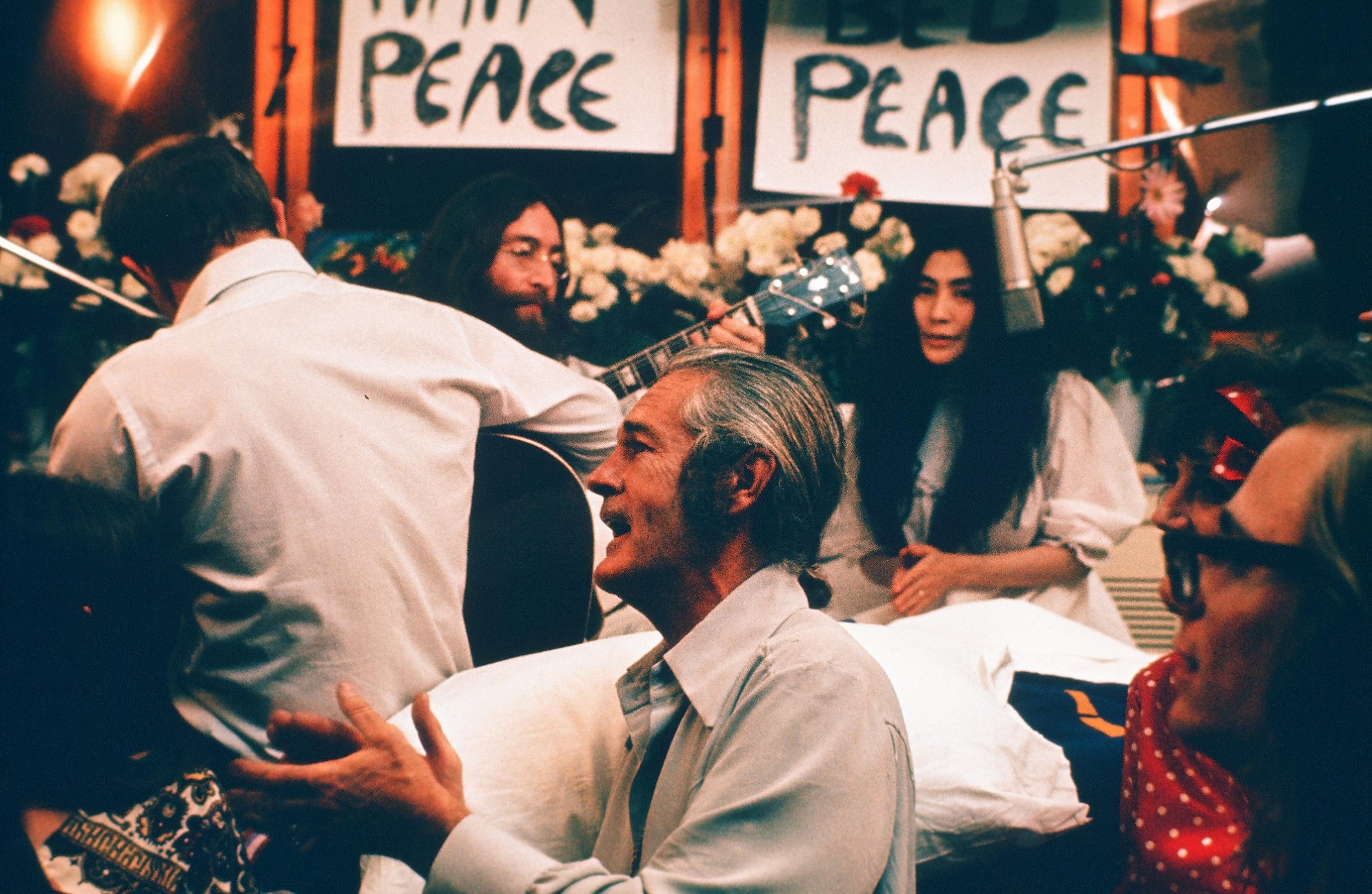
Recording "Give Peace a Chance" at the Queen Elizabeth Hotel, Montreal, on 1 June 1969. Left to right: Rosemary Leary (face not visible), Tommy Smothers (with back to camera playing guitar), John Lennon, Timothy Leary, Yoko Ono, Judy Marcioni and Paul Williams

The song was written during Lennon and Ono's "Bed-In" honeymoon in Montreal. When asked by a reporter what he was trying to achieve by staying in bed, Lennon answered spontaneously "Just give peace a chance". He went on to say this several times during the Bed-In. Lennon asked his press officer, Derek Taylor to find a recording engineer. On 1 June 1969, in Room 1742 at the Queen Elizabeth Hotel in Montreal, André Perry, owner of a local recording studio, arrived and used a simple setup of four microphones and a four-track tape recorder he brought with him.

The recording session was attended by dozens of journalists and various celebrities, including Timothy Leary, Rabbi Abraham Feinberg, Joseph Schwartz, Rosemary Woodruff Leary, Petula Clark, Dick Gregory, Allen Ginsberg, Roger Scott, Murray the K and Derek Taylor, many of whom are mentioned in the lyrics. Lennon played acoustic guitar and was joined by Tommy Smothers of the Smothers Brothers, also on acoustic guitar.

The day after the recording, Perry engaged and recorded three professional singers from Montreal to add backing vocals to the production, among them Mouffe, Louise Forestier and Robert Charlebois, who was a famous pop-star in Quebec and in France.

Some years later, Perry recalled the occasion and spoke about the challenges of getting a good sound out of the recording. Because of the room's poor acoustics, he said, the raw recording could not have been released without help:

Originally there were no intentions to have any over-dubs done. But when I left John, he looked at me and I said, 'Well, I'll go back to the studio and listen to this and see what it's like.' And then I decided that the background was a bit too noisy and needed a little 'sweeping.' By this I mean, we kept all the original stuff, we just improved it a bit by adding if you like, some voices. So we called a bunch of people in the studio that night, I did, actually that was my decision. And that's probably why John gave me such a credit on the single. And since it was multi-track I dubbed the original 4-track to an 8-track machine and then used the other 4-tracks to overdub some voices. The next day I went back to John [with the mix]. They moved everybody out of the room and it was just the three of us, with Yoko, and I played it for him and he thought it was wonderful. Kept it 'as is.' There's a story going around about overdubbing in London, England. Nothing was overdubbed in England. The only thing that was overdubbed, like I said, is some of these people, and the reason why I did it, is I wanted to give him some kind of option. You see the point of the matter, it's not that we wanted to cheat anything, it was a question of like, not usable, the condition was absolutely terrible. [We took] the original stuff that was there, and added a few voices in a cleaner recording environment.

== Songwriting credits ==
When initially released in 1969, the song was credited to Lennon–McCartney.

On later releases curated by the Lennon Estate, only Lennon is credited; viz. the 1990s reissue of the 1986 album Live in New York City, the 2006 documentary The U.S. vs. John Lennon, and the 1997 compilation album Lennon Legend: The Very Best of John Lennon and its DVD version six years later.

John Lennon expressed his regrets about being "guilty enough to give McCartney credit as co-writer on my first independent single instead of giving it to Yoko, who had actually written it with me."

According to author Ian MacDonald, the credit was Lennon's way of thanking McCartney for helping him record "The Ballad of John and Yoko" at short notice.

== Lyrics ==
The original last verse of the song refers to: "John and Yoko, Timmy Leary, Rosemary [Leary], Tommy Smothers, Bobby Dylan, Tommy Cooper, Derek Taylor, Norman Mailer, Allen Ginsberg, and Hare Krishna". In the performance of "Give Peace a Chance" included on the Live Peace in Toronto 1969 album, Lennon openly stated that he could not remember all of the words and improvised with the names of the band members sharing the stage with him and anything that came to mind: "John and Yoko, Eric Clapton, Klaus Voormann, Penny Lane, Roosevelt, Nixon, Tommy Jones and Tommy Cooper, and somebody." The third verse contains a reference to masturbation, but Lennon changed this to "mastication" on the official lyric sheet. He later stated this was a "cop out" but wanted to avoid unnecessary controversy.

== Release and aftermath ==
"Give Peace a Chance", backed with Ono's "Remember Love" as the B-side, was released on 4 July 1969 in the UK, (Note: UK Apple APPLE 13) and a few days later on 7 July 1969 in the US. (Note: US Apple APPLE 1809) The song reached number 2 in the UK Singles Chart, and number 14 on the Billboard Hot 100 in the US. Billboard described it as "an infectious rhythm ballad" with "clever arrangement and performance".

The song quickly became the anthem of the anti Vietnam-war and counterculture movements, and was sung by half a million demonstrators in Washington, D.C., on Vietnam Moratorium Day, on 15 November 1969. They were led by Pete Seeger, who interspersed phrases like, "Are you listening, Nixon?" and "Are you listening, Agnew?", between the choruses of protesters singing, "All we are saying ... is give peace a chance".

A live concert performance of the song is included on Live Peace in Toronto 1969. (Source: Apple Records) John, Yoko, and the Elephant's Memory performed the song on the Jerry Lewis MDA Telethon in September 1972. (Source: YouTube)

The British group Yes also paid tribute to Lennon's words on their 1971 release The Yes Album, in "Your Move".

After being issued as a single, it appeared on an album in a truncated form for the singles compilation Shaved Fish in 1975. The track's first full-length album appearance was on the 1982 compilation The John Lennon Collection. Although technically the first "solo" single released by a member of The Beatles while the band was still active, the artist credit was to the Plastic Ono Band, not John Lennon. Shortly after Lennon's 1980 murder, fans gathered outside the Dakota and sang "Give Peace a Chance". The single re-charted in the UK in January 1981, peaking at number 33. The song is one of three Lennon solo songs, along with "Instant Karma!" and "Imagine", in the Rock and Roll Hall of Fame's 500 Songs that Shaped Rock and Roll.

On 4 March 2022 at 08:45 (CET), 150 European public radio stations broadcast this song for peace and against the 2022 Russian invasion of Ukraine and on 8 March at 12:00 (CET), 200 European private radio stations did the same. The Rockin' 1000 performed this song for the opening of the final of the Eurovision Song Contest 2022, also in reaction to the invasion.

== Personnel ==
- John Lennon – lead vocals, acoustic guitar
- Tom Smothers – acoustic guitar
- Yoko Ono and others – handclaps, tambourine, backing vocals
- Timothy Leary, Petula Clark – backing vocals
- André Perry – percussion, production
- Robert Charlebois - chorus

== Chart performance ==
Chart (1969)	Peak position
Austria Ö3 Austria Top 40	2
Belgium Ultratop	3
Canadian RPM Singles Chart	8
German Media Control Charts	4
Netherlands MegaCharts	1
Norway VG-lista	11
Switzerland Music Charts	4
UK Singles Chart	2
US Billboard Hot 100	14
US Cashbox Top 100	11

== Peace Choir version ==
"Give Peace a Chance"

Single by Peace Choir
- Released: 1 February 1991
- Recorded: 1991
- Length: 3:23
- Label: Virgin
- Songwriter: John Lennon (originally credited to Lennon–McCartney)
- Producer: Lenny Kravitz

In 1991, Ono recorded a new version of the song (as well as a music video) in response to the imminent Gulf War. Accompanying musicians included Amina, Adam Ant, Sebastian Bach, Bros, Felix Cavaliere, Terence Trent D'Arby, Flea, John Frusciante, Peter Gabriel, Kadeem Hardison, Ofra Haza, Joe Higgs, Bruce Hornsby, Lee Jaffe, Al Jarreau, Jazzie B, Davey Johnstone, Lenny Kravitz, Cyndi Lauper, Sean Ono Lennon, Little Richard, LL Cool J, MC Hammer, Michael McDonald, Duff McKagan, Alannah Myles, New Voices of Freedom, Randy Newman, Tom Petty, Iggy Pop, Q-Tip, Bonnie Raitt, Run, Dave Stewart, Teena Marie, Little Steven Van Zandt, Don Was, Wendy & Lisa, Ahmet Zappa, Dweezil Zappa and Moon Unit Zappa as the Peace Choir.

=== Track listings ===
7" single

1. "Give Peace a Chance" – 3:23

CD-maxi

1. "Give Peace a Chance" – 3:23

=== Charts ===
Chart (1991)	Peak position
Billboard Hot 100	54
German Singles Chart	22
New Zealand (Listener)	6
Swiss Singles Chart	7
Dutch Top 40	14
Belgian Singles Chart	12

== Yoko Ono version ==
"Give Peace a Chance"
- TW50070

Single by Yoko Ono
- Released: 1 June 2008 (TW50066); 1 July 2008 (TW50069); 18 February 2009 (Int'l Remixes)
- Genre: Electronic
- Label: Mind Train; Twisted
- Songwriter: John Lennon

Yoko Ono singles chronology
"No, No, No" (2007)	"Give Peace a Chance" (2008)	"I'm Not Getting Enough" (2009)

On 1 June 2008, the 39th anniversary of the song's recording, the first of three digital-only (and thus environmentally friendly) singles were released through Twisted Records exclusively on Beatport with remixes featuring a newly recorded vocal by Yoko Ono. It reached number one on the Billboard Hot Dance Club Play chart on 16 August 2008. These are not the first versions Ono has done of this song: in 2004, she did a new version for Wake Up Everybody; in 2005, a version recalling the events of the 11 September 2001 terrorist attacks on Peace, Love & Truth; and one of the first remixes with the lyrics used in this mix was released on the Open Your Box remix album. The last installment was released 18 February 2009, Ono's birthday.

=== Track listings ===
Mindtrain/Twisted TW50066 (released 1 June 2008)

1. Dave Aude Club Mix (8:26)
2. Dave Aude Dub (8:26)
3. Johnny Vicious Warehouse Dub (8:23)
4. Mike Cruz Dub (8:40)
5. Tommie Sunshine Vocal Mix (6:41)
6. Morel's Pink Noise Vocal Mix (6:42)
7. Morel's Pink Noise Dub (7:09)
8. Double B Full Vocal Mix (6:57)

Mindtrain/Twisted TW50069 (released 1 July 2008)

1. Phunk Investigation Mix (7:45)
2. Eric Kupper Vocal Mix (8:50)
3. Mike Cruz Extended Vocal Mix (10:25)
4. DJ Dan Dub (8:53)
5. Tommie Sunshine Give Peace a Dub (6:40)
6. Morel's Canister Dub (7:23)
7. Mike Cruz Vocal Edit Mix (8:40)

Mindtrain/Twisted [TW50070] (released 18 February 2009) [The International Remixes]

1. Blow-Up Popism Mix (5:00)
2. Blow-Up Electrono Mix (6:44)
3. Kimbar Vocal Mix (8:11)
4. Kimbar Dub Mix (6:54)
5. Tszpun Remix (8:17)
6. Tszpun Dub Mix (8:11)
7. Alex Santer Peaceful Mix (6:11)
8. DJ Meme Club Mix (9:54)
9. Findo Gask Time for Action Dub (5:56)
10. CSS Mix (4:12)
11. Richard Fearless Reach Out Mix (7:05)
12. Karsh Kale Voices of the Tribal Massive Mix (5:55)

=== Weekly charts ===
Chart (2008)	Peak position
Global Dance Tracks (Billboard)	32

== Covers ==
- Lennon's fellow ex-Beatles Paul McCartney and Ringo Starr have each incorporated the song into their live performances as a tribute to Lennon. Ringo Starr & His All-Starr Band often perform the song as an encore after "With a Little Help from My Friends", while McCartney has often performed a medley of the song, combined with "A Day in the Life", since his 2009 live album Good Evening New York City, including for most of his Up and Coming Tour, on Saturday Night Live on 11 December 2010, and in 2011 during the US leg of his On the Run Tour.
- U2 have performed the song in concert at least 27 times in whole or as a snippet, the first time on 13 December 1980 at the Paradise, Boston, Massachusetts and the last time on 18 May 1998 at Waterfront Hall, Belfast, Northern Ireland.
- The song has been used in films, television shows and theatre as it has become a recognised semiotic to indicate protest; for example it was sung by students in the 1974 film The Trial of Billy Jack, and by peace activists in the 1996 film Pretty Village, Pretty Flame. The song was featured in an episode of the TV series Mad About You in 1995.
- Hot Chocolate released the song as their debut single on the Apple label, Apple 18, as 'Hot Chocolate Band', in a reggae version in October 1969.
- Mitch Miller & the Gang covered the song on the Peace Sing-Along album in 1970.
- Aerosmith (featuring Sierra Leone's Refugee All Stars) covered the song for the 2007 benefit album Instant Karma: The Amnesty International Campaign to Save Darfur.
- Elton John recorded the song as a B-side to his UK single "Club at the End of the Street" in 1990. He also performed the song live on his 1970 US tour with bassist Dee Murray and drummer Nigel Olsson, singing only the refrain "All we are saying is give peace a chance".
- Joni Mitchell referenced the song in "California" from her 1971 album Blue.
- The refrain is sung in the background during the Your Move section of Yes' 1971 release "I've Seen All Good People". The song also references Lennon's "Instant Karma!".
- Louis Armstrong recorded the song on 29 May 1970, for an LP entitled Louis Armstrong and Friends (aka What a Wonderful World). The 1970 Louis Armstrong recording was released as a Philips 7" 45 A side single in the UK, 6073 703.
- Pearl Jam's Eddie Vedder led the crowd in singalong to the chorus during a 2003 concert in Adelaide, Australia.
- Madonna performed an acoustic version of the song during her Confessions Tour concert in Moscow, Russia, on 12 September 2006.
- Stevie Wonder performed a snippet of the song at Bonnaroo 2010 and in 1972 at Madison Square Garden in a performance with Lennon and Ono.
- Jazz guitarist Bill Frisell recorded the song for his 2011 album All We Are Saying.
- The metal band Aftermath recorded and released the song as a single in 2020. The version was mentioned in both the official John Lennon Facebook and Twitter pages.
- The song was performed by Rockin' 1000 as part of the opening segment of the final of the 2022 Eurovision Song Contest.
- A version of the song in Russian by Jackie-O, Sati Akura, Onsa Media and others was released March 26, 2022, after Secretary-General António Guterres' reference at the start of an emergency meeting of the UN Security Council on the Ukrainian War.

== See also ==
- List of anti-war songs
