= Hard Times Are Over =

1980 song by John Lennon and Yoko Ono

- Label of 12" single version with "It Happened"

Song by Yoko Ono

from the album Double Fantasy
- Released: 17 November 1980
- Recorded: 19 August–23 September 1980
- Length: 3:20
- Label: Geffen
- Songwriter: Yoko Ono
- Producers: John Lennon, Yoko Ono, Jack Douglas

Double Fantasy track listing
- 14 tracks Side one: 1. "(Just Like) Starting Over"; 2. "Kiss Kiss Kiss"; 3. "Cleanup Time"; 4. "Give Me Something"; 5. "I'm Losing You"; 6. "I'm Moving On"; 7. "Beautiful Boy (Darling Boy)"; Side two: 8. "Watching the Wheels"; 9. "Yes, I'm Your Angel"; 10. "Woman"; 11. "Beautiful Boys"; 12. "Dear Yoko"; 13. "Every Man Has a Woman Who Loves Him"; 14. "Hard Times Are Over"

"Hard Times Are Over"

Song by Yoko Ono

from the album A Story
- Released: 1 July 1997
- Recorded: 1974
- Length: 4:37
- Label: Rykodisc
- Songwriter: Yoko Ono
- Producers: Yoko Ono, David Spinozza

"Hard Times Are Over" is a song written by Yoko Ono that was first released on her and John Lennon's 1980 album Double Fantasy. It was later released as the second song on the B-side of the 12" version of Ono's single "Walking on Thin Ice". A version recorded in 1974 was released on Ono's 1997 album A Story.

== Writing and recording ==
Ono originally wrote "Hard Times Are Over" in 1973, for an intended follow up album to Feeling the Space. The original version, recorded in 1974, was eventually released on Ono's album A Story in 1997. The Double Fantasy verson was recorded in 1980 with Ono and Lennon on vocals, Lennon Hugh McCracken and Earl Slick on guitar, Tony Levin on bass guitar, George Small on keyboards, Arthur Jenkins on percussion, Andy Newmark on drums, and the Benny Cummings Singer - Kings Temple choir providing backing vocals. The instruments were recorded on 19 August 1980, the choir was overdubbed on 11 September, Ono's vocals were overdubbed on 19 September and Lennon's vocals were overdubbed on 23 September.

== Lyrics and music ==
The "hard times" referred to in the song are the couple's drug use, Ono said "We were going to withdraw. And we were withdrawing while we were going cross-country. Can you imagine that? It was a station wagon [that] Peter Bentley, our assistant, was driving, and we were trying to get off drugs. And it was really frightening! So we're standing on a corner looking at each other and saying 'OK, we're going to get off drugs', it's great."

Hartford Courant critic Henry McNulty described the lyrics as "a look back over the turbulent times and ahead to the joys of raising a family and returning to the performing life." Music critic Johnny Rogan suggested that the lyrics "[offer] the comfort of middle-aged security after a lifeime of struggle." Although the refrain announces that "hard times are over", it adds the qualification that this is only the case "for a while". Rogan noted the poignancy of this qualification given the fact that shortly after the song was released, Lennon was murdered. In his review that was published the day before Lennon was murdered, McNulty described the phrase "for a while" as tempering somewhat the "cheerful optimism" of the rest of the song.

Music lecturers Ken Bielen and Ben Urish described the song as being a gospel-tinged ballad. They describe the music as "sweeping majestic" but with a "loose feel" that is appropriate accompaniment to lyrics announcing that "hard times are over." Rogan described the music as "anthemic".

== Single release ==
Ono included "Hard Times Are Over" as a 2nd track (after "It Happened") on the 12" version of her single "Walking on Thin Ice". According to Ono, it was included on the single to balance the sad mood of the other songs on the record. It was not included on the 7" version of the single, which only includes "It Happened" as the b-side.

== Reception ==
Reviewing the version from A Story, AllMusic criitc Richie Unterberger said that "Hard Times Are Over" "may have been [Ono's] first song to carry anything resembling mainstream pop appeal, with its Harrison-esque slide guitar flourishes." Billboard critic Roman Kozak called the song "beautiful". Roanoke Times writer Mark Layman commented on the verse "The streams are twinkling in the sun / And I'm smiling inside / You and I walking together 'round the street corner." Layman said "I love the picture that paints - John and Yoko walking hand-in-hand on the streets of New York...not a fantasy at all but the reality of their new life together."
