= I'm Losing You (John Lennon song) =

1980 song by John Lennon

- 1998 promo CD cover

Song by John Lennon

from the album Double Fantasy
- Released: 17 November 1980
- Recorded: 6 August–13 October 1980
- Genre: Blues rock
- Length: 3:05
- Label: Geffen
- Songwriter: John Lennon
- Producers: John Lennon, Yoko Ono, Jack Douglas

Double Fantasy track listing
- 14 tracks Side one: 1. "(Just Like) Starting Over"; 2. "Kiss Kiss Kiss"; 3. "Cleanup Time"; 4. "Give Me Something"; 5. "I'm Losing You"; 6. "I'm Moving On"; 7. "Beautiful Boy (Darling Boy)"; Side two: 8. "Watching the Wheels"; 9. "Yes, I'm Your Angel"; 10. "Woman"; 11. "Beautiful Boys"; 12. "Dear Yoko"; 13. "Every Man Has a Woman Who Loves Him"; 14. "Hard Times Are Over"

"I'm Losing You" is a song written by John Lennon and released on his 1980 album Double Fantasy. It was written in Bermuda in June 1980, after several attempts by Lennon to call his wife, Yoko Ono, who remained in New York. The song is also available on the 1982 compilation The John Lennon Collection, the 1998 boxset John Lennon Anthology, the one disc compilation Wonsaponatime, the 2005 two disc compilation Working Class Hero: The Definitive Lennon and in 2010 for the Gimme Some Truth album. The song was also featured in the 2005 musical Lennon.

== Lyrics and music ==
Lennon completed "I'm Losing You" in 1980 while in Bermuda after trying to call wife Yoko Ono but not being able to get through. His annoyance became a jumping off point for a deeper examination of the state of his marriage. The lyrics acknowledge that the relationship is in trouble, and Lennon admits that he has hurt his wife, but he also resents the fact that she won't let him live down his mistakes. He also claims that those mistakes occurred long ago. According to pop historian Robert Rodriguez, the candidness of Lennon's exploration of his feelings give the song a potency that recalls songs from John Lennon/Plastic Ono Band and Walls and Bridges. Music critic Johnny Rogan also sees similarities with songs written during his mid-70s separation from Yoko Ono, when many of the Walls and Bridges songs were written. And Lennon has confirmed that although the song was originally inspired by his feelings over the phone call, it also expresses his feelings about losing Yoko Ono during their 18-month separation (i.e., his lost weekend) as well as other losses, including the loss of his mother, which was the subject of several songs on John Lennon/Plastic Ono Band.

The opening line in the song has the singer wondering why he went to the room of a "stranger" for comfort. It is left ambiguous whether the stranger is someone other than his lover, or whether the stranger is actually his lover, to whom he has become so alienated that she seems like a stranger. In another line, "do you still have to carry that cross?", the singer uses The Passion as a metaphor for his lover's refusal to forgive him.

Another line from the song is "here in the valley of indecision/I don't know what to do". This is a reference to the title of the 1945 movie The Valley of Decision. Shortly after writing the song, Lennon explained to son Sean that he was often indecisive as a result of the pain he suffered when having to choose which parent to live with when his parents separated.

The ad-lib after the last line, "Don't want to lose you now," is a quotation of the similarly titled Temptations song, "(I Know) I'm Losing You."

Authors Ken Bielen and Ben Urish say that the "big" drum sound and guitar part help create a "tense atmosphere", and liken the drum sound to production styles that became common later in the decade.

An earlier version of the song was entitled "Stranger's Room". According to rock journalist Paul Du Noyer, "Stranger's Room" was written in 1978.

== Recording ==
Lennon recorded an early demo version of "I'm Losing You" in July 1980. This version, part of which appeared on The Lost Lennon Tapes, was played on acoustic guitar with a drum machine, and Lennon overdubbed additional guitar and vocal parts.

Producer Jack Douglas originally suggested that Lennon use Cheap Trick as the backing band to play on the song. A version was recorded on 12 August 1980 with Cheap Trick's guitarist Rick Nielsen and drummer Bun E. Carlos backing Lennon. They also recorded a version of Yoko Ono's "I'm Moving On", which is a companion piece to "I'm Losing You".

Lennon was impressed enough with their performance that Lennon told Carlos that he wished Nielsen had been his second guitarist for "Cold Turkey", but ultimately this version was not included on Double Fantasy (nor was the Cheap Trick-backed version of "I'm Moving On".) Possible reasons for their exclusions are that Cheap Trick's management may have wanted too much money, or that Lennon believed that the performances were more "heavy" than he wanted. However, when the Double Fantasy version of "I'm Losing You" was recorded, the version with Cheap Trick's backing was played through the session musicians' headphones to help inspire their performances. The Cheap Trick version was eventually released on John Lennon Anthology, albeit without an overdubbed guitar part played by Nielsen. In 2024, Douglas gave an opinion on why it wasn't used in 1980: "However, when it was done, we listened to it and though we all loved it, we felt it didn’t fit in the context of the whole record. Suddenly, that would leap out in a different way....But I knew the Cheap Trick version would be available, somewhere and somehow."

"I'm Losing You" was first recorded with the Double Fantasy session musicians on 18 August 1980, but Lennon was dissatisfied with this performance, and thus a third recording was made on 26 August, which was released on Double Fantasy. A horn arrangement was overdubbed on 5 September, but this was ultimately deleted from the released version of the song. Lennon's vocal was recorded on 22 September.

== Reception ==
At one point, "I'm Losing You" was planned as a single, but after Lennon's murder it was shelved as being "eerily inappropriate". Nonetheless, what appears to be a single edit was made, fading the Double Fantasy version early to avoid the crossfade to "I'm Moving On", and which appears to have been used for the compilation albums The John Lennon Collection and Lennon. Stickers on the Double Fantasy record album emphasised the inclusion of "I'm Losing You".

In 1998, Capitol Records issued "I'm Losing You" as part of a two-track promotional CD, backed with Lennon's recording of "Only You", to promote the John Lennon Anthology album. The CD was issued catalogue number LENNON 001. A promotional film was also made for this version, with Nielsen, Carlos and Levin miming their performances. The film incorporated animations of drawings Lennon had made.

Rogan considers "I'm Losing You" to be one of the best songs on Double Fantasy. Author Scott Walker calls "I'm Losing You" Lennon's "best composition of 1980". Rock journalist Paul Du Noyer considers "I'm Losing You" to be proof "that Double Fantasy is a work of greater emotional complexity than many of its critics are prepared to admit", and gives lie to the notion that Lennon and Ono used the album to "paint a falsely benign portrait of their marriage". Ultimate Classic Rock critic Nick DeRiso called "I'm Losing You" the most underrated song on Double Fantasy, saying that it "provides a deeper sense of the long-awaited return of Lennon's muse" than the more famous songs on the album and saying that in the song "Lennon was coming to grips with what lay ahead (middle age, a settled life, marriage and parenthood), and also how much fight was still left in him." Ultimate Classic Rock critic Nick DeRiso rated it as the 4th best song on Double Fantasy behind only the hit singles, saying that "we get a deeper sense of how [Lennon's] muse returned, as Lennon began trying to find balance between the vibrant, angry yang to his bread-making house-husband yin.

Authors Ben Urish and Ken Bielen call "I'm Losing You" the "toughest" song on Double Fantasy. However, they lament that it could have been even tougher had the Cheap Trick version been used. Of the Cheap Trick version released on Anthology they claim that "the take is quite good, and without the production gloss of the album, it roars without sounding incomplete, making it an obvious highlight of the 1998 collection".

== Cover versions ==
Cheap Trick themselves covered "I'm Losing You" on their 2001 album Silver. Murray Head covered it on his 2002 album Passion. Colin James covered the song on his 2003 album Traveler. Corinne Bailey Rae covered the song on the 2007 charity album Instant Karma: The Amnesty International Campaign to Save Darfur. Ana Popović recorded a version of the song on her 2015 album Blue Room.

== Personnel ==
The musicians who performed on the original recording were as follows:

- John Lennon – vocals, rhythm guitar
- Earl Slick, Hugh McCracken – lead guitar
- Tony Levin – bass
- George Small – keyboards
- Andy Newmark – drums
- Arthur Jenkins – percussion
