= The John Lennon Collection =

- Cover picture by Annie Leibovitz

Compilation album by John Lennon
- Released: 8 November 1982
- Recorded: June 1969 – October 1980
- Genre: Rock
- Length: 63:29
- Labels: Parlophone (UK), Geffen (US)
- Producers: John Lennon, Yoko Ono, Phil Spector, Jack Douglas

John Lennon chronology
| Double Fantasy (1980) | The John Lennon Collection (1982) | Milk and Honey (1984) |

Singles from The John Lennon Collection
- 1. "Love" Released: 15 November 1982 (UK); 2. "Happy Xmas (War Is Over)" Released: November 1982 (US)

The John Lennon Collection is a posthumous compilation album of music from John Lennon's solo career, released on 8 November 1982 through Parlophone Records in the UK and 10 November through Geffen Records in the US.

== Release and selection ==
The album was originally scheduled for release in late 1981, but was held back a year due to legalities since half the songs on the album were licensed to EMI and the other half, songs from Double Fantasy, were licensed to Geffen. It was eventually released on 8 November 1982 by Parlophone in the United Kingdom, followed by two days later through Geffen in the United States. It was the first Lennon album to be issued following his death in 1980. The album includes most of Lennon's hit singles and other tracks from his solo albums recorded with EMI from 1970 to 1975, as well as all but one of his compositions (track 3 - "Cleanup Time") from his final album Double Fantasy, which was initially distributed by Geffen Records in America and EMI/Parlophone in the United Kingdom. (Note: US Geffen GHSP 2023) "Cleanup Time" was later collected for the first time on the 1990 box set Lennon.

The EMI selections on the album are similar to those on Shaved Fish, Lennon's 1975 compilation album, but without the singles "Cold Turkey", "Mother" and "Woman Is the Nigger of the World." The 1975 hit single "Stand by Me" and "Love", a popular track from the John Lennon/Plastic Ono Band album, were added. The other half consisted of many of the tracks from Double Fantasy. In the US, the album was issued with a slightly different track listing, (Note: "Watching the Wheels" and "Dear Yoko" had swapped places.) with "Happy Xmas (War Is Over)" and "Stand by Me" only released on the cassette edition.

== Reissue ==
In 1989, after EMI acquired the rights to the Double Fantasy material, The John Lennon Collection was remastered and reissued worldwide with two bonus tracks for its CD release, (Note: UK Parlophone CDEMTV 37) "Move Over Ms. L" and "Cold Turkey" (the former being the only officially released Lennon track previously unavailable on any UK album, the latter the only UK hit single originally excluded from the compilation). "Move Over Ms. L" was the more notable inclusion: originally intended for Walls and Bridges but cut at the last minute, it was released as the B-side to "Stand by Me". The CD was released in the UK on 23 October 1989. "Less Christmassy than it sounds, ['Cold Turkey'] is now restored on CD," wrote Mat Snow in Q, "and is guaranteed to poop any party of sentimental Lennonism – presumably why it's kept till last; 1970's Plastic Ono Band album apart, it remains his most discomfortingly intense work."

In the US, the 1989 CD re-issue of The John Lennon Collection not only included the two bonus tracks but also the two songs originally excluded from the US vinyl release, "Happy Xmas (War Is Over)" and "Stand by Me" (these were 'bonus cassette-only tracks' in the US), thereby making the track-listing now identical in both countries.

== Reception ==
Professional ratings
Review scores
| Source | Rating |
|---|---|
| AllMusic | 4.5/5 stars |
| MusicHound | 4/5 stars |

As Lennon's first posthumous release, The John Lennon Collection did extremely well, reaching number 1 in the UK and peaking at number 33 in the US where it would eventually reach triple platinum. The album sold 300,000 copies in the first week, and 1 million by its third week in the UK. In the UK, "Love" was excerpted as a single, (Note: UK Parlophone R 5958) (featuring a version of the song without the slow fade-ins) and managed to reach number 41. "Beautiful Boy (Darling Boy)" was released as the B-side to "Happy Xmas (War Is Over)", which was released by Geffen, in a new picture sleeve, in the US. (Note: US Geffen 7-29855)

== Cover ==
The front and back cover photographs for The John Lennon Collection were taken by famed photographer Annie Leibovitz on 8 December 1980; Lennon was murdered later that evening by Mark David Chapman at Lennon's residence the Dakota.

== Track listing ==
All tracks are written by John Lennon, except where noted.

Side one
| No. | Title | Writer(s) | Length |
|---|---|---|---|
| 1. | "Give Peace a Chance" | Originally credited to Lennon–McCartney, the credit was revised in the 1990s to cite only Lennon as its composer | 4:52 |
| 2. | "Instant Karma!" | | 3:20 |
| 3. | "Power to the People" | | 3:16 |
| 4. | "Whatever Gets You thru the Night" (Featuring Elton John on harmony vocal and piano) | | 3:17 |
| 5. | "#9 Dream" | | 4:46 |
| 6. | "Mind Games" | | 4:12 |
| 7. | "Love" (Released as a single unique to this collection. Originally released in 1970 on John Lennon/Plastic Ono Band) | | 3:22 |
| 8. | "Happy Xmas (War Is Over)" (Originally excluded from the US vinyl version, included on cassette and 1989 re-issue) | Lennon/Yoko Ono | 3:33 |

Side two
| No. | Title | Writer(s) | Length |
|---|---|---|---|
| 9. | "Imagine" | Originally credited to Lennon, the credit was revised in the 2010s to cite Ono as co-composer | 3:02 |
| 10. | "Jealous Guy" | | 4:14 |
| 11. | "Stand by Me" (Originally excluded from the US vinyl version of this compilation, included on cassette and 1989 re-issue) | Jerry Leiber/Mike Stoller/Ben E. King | 3:25 |
| 12. | "(Just Like) Starting Over" | | 3:55 |
| 13. | "Woman" | | 3:25 |
| 14. | "I'm Losing You" | | 3:57 |
| 15. | "Beautiful Boy (Darling Boy)" | | 4:01 |
| 16. | "Watching the Wheels" | | 3:31 |
| 17. | "Dear Yoko" | | 2:33 |
| Total length: | | | 69:29 |

1989 CD bonus tracks
| No. | Title | Length |
|---|---|---|
| 18. | "Move Over Ms. L" (Originally released in 1975 as "Stand by Me"'s B-Side) | 2:56 |
| 19. | "Cold Turkey" | 5:01 |
| Total length: | | 77:26 |

== Charts ==
=== Weekly charts ===
| Chart (1982–2001) | Position |
|---|---|
| Australian Kent Music Report | 1 |
| Canadian RPM Albums Chart | 29 |
| Dutch Mega Albums Chart | 32 |
| Finnish Albums Chart | 21 |
| Italian Albums (Musica e dischi) | 1 |
| Japanese Oricon LP Chart | 8 |
| New Zealand Albums Chart | 5 |
| Norwegian VG-lista Albums Chart | 1 |
| Swedish Albums Chart | 4 |
| UK Albums Chart | 1 |
| US Billboard 200 | 33 |
| West German Media Control Albums Chart | 62 |

=== Year-end charts ===
| Chart (1982) | Position |
|---|---|
| UK Albums Chart | 10 |
| Chart (1983) | Position |
| Australian Albums Chart | 23 |
| UK Albums Chart | 30 |

== Certifications and sales ==
| Region | Certification | Certified units/sales |
|---|---|---|
| Argentina (CAPIF) | Gold | 30,000^{^} |
| Austria (IFPI Austria) | Gold | 25,000^{*} |
| Australia (ARIA) | 4× Platinum | 280,000^{^} |
| Canada (Music Canada) | Platinum | 100,000^{^} |
| France (SNEP) | Platinum | 300,000^{*} |
| Japan (Oricon Charts) | — | 205,000 |
| New Zealand (RMNZ) | Platinum | 15,000^{^} |
| Norway (IFPI Norway) | Gold | 25,000^{*} |
| Spain (Promusicae) | Platinum | 100,000^{^} |
| United Kingdom (BPI) | 3× Platinum | 900,000^{^} |
| United States (RIAA) | 3× Platinum | 3,000,000^{^} |
^{*} Sales figures based on certification alone.^{^} Shipments figures based on certification alone.

== Credits ==
- Mastering – Greg Fulginiti (1982)
