= Dear Yoko =

1980 song by John Lennon

Song by John Lennon

from the album Double Fantasy
- Released: 17 November 1980
- Recorded: 14 August–22 September 1980
- Length: 2:34
- Label: Geffen
- Songwriter: John Lennon
- Producers: John Lennon, Yoko Ono, Jack Douglas

Double Fantasy track listing
- 14 tracks Side one: 1. "(Just Like) Starting Over"; 2. "Kiss Kiss Kiss"; 3. "Cleanup Time"; 4. "Give Me Something"; 5. "I'm Losing You"; 6. "I'm Moving On"; 7. "Beautiful Boy (Darling Boy)"; Side two: 8. "Watching the Wheels"; 9. "Yes, I'm Your Angel"; 10. "Woman"; 11. "Beautiful Boys"; 12. "Dear Yoko"; 13. "Every Man Has a Woman Who Loves Him"; 14. "Hard Times Are Over"

"Dear Yoko" is a song written by John Lennon that was first released on his and Yoko Ono's 1980 album Double Fantasy.

== Lyrics and music ==
The lyrics of "Dear Yoko" express Lennon's joy at being with Yoko Ono. It also affirms his love for Ono and his need for reassurance from her. In those ways it is similar to Lennon's song "Oh Yoko!" from his 1971 album Imagine but, according to music lecturers Ken Beilen and Ben Urish, "Dear Yoko" lacks the earlier song's "manic quality". Lennon referred to "Dear Yoko" as "Oh Yoko" part 2. Culture Sonar writer Jude Southerland Kessler said that "The song teems with simplistic teenage love poetry; it froths with innocence and fun" with lyrics such as "Even when I watch TV, there’s a hole where you’re supposed to be" and "Even if it’s just one hour, I wilt just like a faded flower."

The musical arrangement has similarities to Buddy Holly. The "wella-hella-hella" that Lennon sings to begin the song is reminiscent of the beginning of Holly's song "Rave On". Producer Jack Douglas said "It had an early fifties feel to it that John was so good at because he was good at that rhythm. I thought it was the lightest, funniest track on the record." Bielen and Urish suggest that the song has a Caribbean rhythm.

Lennon said of the song "The track is a nice track and it happens to be about my wife instead of 'Dear Sandra' or some other person that a singer would sing about who may or may not exist."

== Recording ==
Lennon made demo recordings of the song during the spring on 1980. The initial recording of the instruments was made on 14 August 1980 and instrumental overdubbing was done in late August. Lennon recorded his vocal on 22 September, the same day he signed the record deal with Geffen Records which would release Double Fantasy. Lennon played guitar on the song. He was backed on the song by musicians Hugh McCracken on guitar and harmonica, Tony Levin on bass guitar, Andy Newmark on drums, and George Small on keyboards. Earl Slick was supposed to be the guitarist but Slick was hungover the day of the recording so McCracken filled in. When recording the song, Lennon told the backing musicians to model it on the Shirley and Company song "Shame, Shame, Shame".

== Reception ==
Beatle biographer John Blaney said of it "Every bit as jubilant and celebratory as 'Oh Yoko!', it lacks the poetic allusions that lifted that song from a work of craft to something approaching art."

== Other versions ==
An alternate take of the song is included on the box set John Lennon Anthology. A version of the song played on acoustic guitar is included on Lennon's compilation album Acoustic. Bielen and Urich say that this version sounds even more like the Buddy Holly songs that inspired this song than the version on Double Fantasy.
