= Lennon (musical) =

2005 American musical

- The Broadway poster, printed on the cover of Playbill
- Music: John Lennon
- Lyrics: John Lennon
- Book: Don Scardino
- Basis: Life of John Lennon
- Premiere: April 12, 2005: Orpheum Theatre (San Francisco)
- Productions: 2005 San Francisco; 2005 Broadway

Lennon is a musical with music and lyrics by John Lennon and book by Don Scardino, who also directed its premiere. The musical is about the life of Lennon and is notable for Scardino's choice to be almost exclusively based on Lennon's own words and to focus on Lennon's solo career, with no songs from the Lennon–McCartney catalogue.

The "$7 million bio-musical" first opened in San Francisco, California, in April 2005. After what The Times described as "a troubled try-out in San Francisco, a cancelled run in Boston and a radical rewrite", it had 42 previews and 49 performances on Broadway at the Broadhurst Theatre from 14 August to 24 September 2005. The role of Lennon is played by performers of both sexes and different ages and skin colours, an approach Scardino said was inspired by "I Am the Walrus" where Lennon writes, "I am he, as you are he, as you are me, and we are all together." This use of multiple actors was scaled back after the San Francisco production, with the final rewrite having a single actor narrating Lennon's story.

Yoko Ono was actively involved in the production, retaining final script approval and requiring the show's Broadway producers to complete the script and present it to her live (albeit in workshop format). The show's credits included the phrase "With Special Thanks to Yoko Ono Lennon".

The limited use of Beatles songs, attributed to creative choices and not licensing issues, led critics to dismiss the work as "Ono-centric". Ono was unapologetic about the choice: "If we put 'Yesterday' in, it's not really fair to the Beatles because we're leaning on their power. We're talking about John now, thank you." She later said "It is definitely John's story – from Liverpool 1940 to New York 1980. I am the B-side, and that's how it should be. I think he would have loved it." The musical also conspicuously omits any mention of May Pang, Lennon's lover for a period of 18 months in 1974–75 when the singer was separated from Ono.

== Broadway opening ==
The Broadway production went into previews on 7 July 2005, opened 14 August 2005, in which it ran for forty-one days, and closed on 24 September of the same year.

The Broadway premiere was produced by Allan McKeown, Edgar Lansbury (who conceived the show and brought in Scardino), Clear Channel Entertainment and Jeffrey Sine.

The opening night cast of Lennon included Will Chase (who as narrator was the "lead" John Lennon), Chuck Cooper, Julie Danao-Salkin, Mandy Gonzalez, Marcy Harriell, Chad Kimball, Terrence Mann, Julia Murney, Michael Potts, Rona Figueroa, Mark Richard Ford, Nicole Lewis and Darin Murphy.

The show opened to negative reviews, with Ben Brantley of The New York Times stating:

In the immortal words of Yoko Ono, "Aieeeee!" A fierce primal scream – of the kind Ms. Ono is famous for as a performance and recording artist – is surely the healthiest response to the agony of "Lennon," the jerry-built musical shrine that opened last night at the Broadhurst Theater.

Playbill quoted Paul Shaffer in its coverage of the musical's opening night:

I just thought it was phenomenal. It reminded me of what an influence John was — how strong an influence he was not only in popular music but in culture, and how much we miss him. He was a remarkable writer. He'd do catchy so you loved the song right away, then the second time you would hear more of it. Let's face it: the more you listen to his music, the more you hear. I'm still learning things when I hear his songs.

== Songs ==
The musical includes two previously unpublished songs by Lennon: "India, India" and "I Don't Want to Lose You", the latter of which is a working title to Now and Then. Now and Then is a song that was originally a demo recorded sometime around 1977, and it would be considered a possible third single to The Beatles Anthology project in 1995 along with Free as a Bird and Real Love before being put on hold due to technical difficulties. It would be officially released on November 2, 2023 by the Beatles billed as their "last song".

A December 2004 Playbill article mentioned that the rarely heard Lennon song "Cookin' (in the Kitchen of Love)" (heard on the Ringo's Rotogravure album by Ringo Starr) would also be included, though the song was cut before the musical's Broadway opening.

Act I

- "New York City"
- "Mother"
- "Look at Me"
- "Money (That's What I Want)"
- "Twist and Shout"
- "Instant Karma!"
- "India, India"
- "Real Love" ("Girls and Boys")
- "Oh My Love"
- "Mind Games"
- "The Ballad of John and Yoko"
- "How Do You Sleep?"
- "God"
- "Give Peace a Chance"

Act II

- "Power to the People"
- "Woman Is the Nigger of the World"
- "Attica State"
- "Gimme Some Truth"
- "I'm Losing You"/"I'm Moving On"
- "I'm Stepping Out"
- "I Don't Want to Lose You"
- "Whatever Gets You thru the Night"
- "Woman"
- "Beautiful Boy (Darling Boy)"
- "Watching the Wheels"
- "(Just Like) Starting Over"
- "Grow Old with Me"
- "Imagine"
