= Give Me Something (Yoko Ono song) =

Song by Yoko Ono

from the album Double Fantasy
- Released: 17 November 1980
- Recorded: 1980
- Genre: New wave; disco-punk
- Length: 1:35
- Label: Geffen
- Songwriter: Yoko Ono
- Producers: Yoko Ono, Jack Douglas

Double Fantasy track listing
- 14 tracks Side one: 1. "(Just Like) Starting Over"; 2. "Kiss Kiss Kiss"; 3. "Cleanup Time"; 4. "Give Me Something"; 5. "I'm Losing You"; 6. "I'm Moving On"; 7. "Beautiful Boy (Darling Boy)"; Side two: 8. "Watching the Wheels"; 9. "Yes, I'm Your Angel"; 10. "Woman"; 11. "Beautiful Boys"; 12. "Dear Yoko"; 13. "Every Man Has a Woman Who Loves Him"; 14. "Hard Times Are Over"

"Give Me Something" is a song by Yoko Ono, originally released in 1980 on John Lennon and Ono's duet album Double Fantasy. The song appeared in Ono's off-Broadway musical New York Rock and her compilation albums Walking on Thin Ice and Onobox. In 2010, the Junior Boys remix of the song was released as a free download on MySpace Music and RCRD LBL.

== Background ==
"Give Me Something" was written by Yoko Ono and produced by Ono and Jack Douglas. Ono stated in an interview that "Give Me Something" was written as a "feeling that I had about society. [...] We’re all getting very cold now as a society." Ono further explained the song's theme of coldness to Spinner: "I remember I was envisioning a gray, cold city with people walking with hands in their pockets and putting the collars of their coats up."

== Critical reception ==
Larry Fitzmaurice from Pitchfork Media described the original version as a "spiky new-wave tune featuring a particularly angry vocal performance," but commented that the Junior Boys "smooth out some of the tune's rougher edges, morphing Ono's cries into elastic bursts and turning the track into a Danceteria-worthy disco jam."

== Chart performance ==
The song became Yoko Ono's fourth consecutive number-one hit on the Billboard Hot Dance Club chart.

== Track listing ==
- Digital download (Vocal Mixes)
1. "Give Me Something" (Morel's I Gave You My Heart Mix) – 6:55
2. "Give Me Something" (Dave Audé Club Mix) – 8:14
3. "Give Me Something" (TWISTED Sound+Vision Club Mix) – 7:13
4. "Give Me Something" (StoneBridge Club Mix) – 5:53
5. "Give Me Something" (Ralphi's BIG Vocal) – 8:19
6. "Give Me Something" (Roberto Rodriguez Extended Vocal Mix) – 10:06
7. "Give Me Something" (Junior Boys Club Mix) – 4:52
8. "Give Me Something" (Alex Trax Club Mix) – 7:02
9. "Give Me Something" (Floppy Kid Original Re-edit) – 2:43
10. "Give Me Something" (BONUS TRACK: Sparks Reinvention) – 4:19
- Digital download (Dub Mixes)
1. "Give Me Something" (Morel's I Gave You My Heart Dub) – 7:04
2. "Give Me Something" (Dave Audé Dub Mix) – 6:45
3. "Give Me Something" (Stonebridge Dub Mix) – 5:53
4. "Give Me Something" (TWISTED Sound+Vision Dub) – 6:57
5. "Give Me Something" (Ralphi's BIG Club Dub) – 8:14
6. "Give Me Something" (Alex Trax Dub) – 6:34
7. "Give Me Something" (Roberto Rodriguez Let's You Have It Mix) – 7:49
8. "Give Me Something" (Roberto Rodriguez Instrumental Dub) – 7:53

== Charts ==
=== Weekly charts ===
Chart (2010)	Peak position
US Dance Club Songs (Billboard)	1
Global Dance Tracks (Billboard)	27

=== Year-end charts ===
Chart (2010)	Position
US Hot Dance Club Songs (Billboard)	23

== See also ==
- List of number-one dance singles of 2010 (U.S.)
