= Cleanup Time =

Song by John Lennon

from the album Double Fantasy
- Released: 17 November 1980
- Recorded: 13 August; 5, 17 September 1980
- Genre: Funk rock
- Length: 2:58
- Label: Geffen
- Songwriter: John Lennon
- Producers: John Lennon, Yoko Ono, Jack Douglas

Double Fantasy track listing
- 14 tracks Side one: 1. "(Just Like) Starting Over"; 2. "Kiss Kiss Kiss"; 3. "Cleanup Time"; 4. "Give Me Something"; 5. "I'm Losing You"; 6. "I'm Moving On"; 7. "Beautiful Boy (Darling Boy)"; Side two: 8. "Watching the Wheels"; 9. "Yes, I'm Your Angel"; 10. "Woman"; 11. "Beautiful Boys"; 12. "Dear Yoko"; 13. "Every Man Has a Woman Who Loves Him"; 14. "Hard Times Are Over"

"Cleanup Time" is a song written by John Lennon released on his 1980 album Double Fantasy. It was also included on the compilation album Lennon.

== Lyrics and music ==
Like some other songs on Double Fantasy, including the hit single "(Just Like) Starting Over," one of the themes of "Cleanup Time" is rebirth, and another theme, as with "Watching the Wheels" is Lennon "coming to terms with his quiet years," during which Lennon was a househusband and Yoko Ono looked after the couple's business interests. Lennon wrote the song in Bermuda in June 1980. It was inspired by a phone discussion Lennon had with Jack Douglas, who would become the producer of Double Fantasy, while Lennon was staying in Bermuda. The two discussed the 1970s and how people were cleaning up their alcohol and drug habits, and the conversation ended with Douglas stating that "Well, it's cleanup time, right" and Lennon responding "It sure is." Lennon was then inspired to start playing a boogie on the piano, and wrote "Cleanup Time" in the process. Lennon has described the song as "a piano lick, with the words added." After developing the piano lick and having the title, Lennon wrote the words around a conception of the Lennon's home, The Dakota, being metaphorically their Palace of Versailles.

Although Lennon claimed that the lyrics apply to people in general, and not specifically to the Lennons, the song does reflect the reality of the Lennons cleaning up their diets and their finances, as well as their drug habits, and reports on what the previous five years away from recording meant to the Lennons. The song, like Lennon's Beatles' song "Cry Baby Cry," incorporates elements of the nursery rhyme "Sing a Song of Sixpence." In the case of "Cleanup Time," the references to the king being in the kitchen and the queen counting the money may be autobiographical references. Lennon had become a househusband while Ono was taking care of the couple's finances. The song explicitly references that the king is baking bread, and Lennon was particularly proud of baking bread himself. The lyrics also reflect Lennon's happiness being at home and being free of many obligations, such as recording contracts.

According to author Andrew Jackson, "Cleanup Time" and "Woman" represent "the happy ending fade out of a bohemian It's a Wonderful Life," as the troubled young Lennon had found peace as a father and husband. Tim Riley remarks that the song works on two levels: "a playfully gentle gibe at household chores" and as "an adult song about addiction."

== Recording ==
"Cleanup Time" began recording at the Hit Factory in New York City on 13 August 1980. Horn overdubs were added on 5 September and Lennon's vocal was recorded on 17 September. Mixing was completed by Yoko Ono on 18 October. It was the last song from Double Fantasy to be completed.

Guitarist Earl Slick played the opening guitar solo, and included a musical quote of the 1975 David Bowie song Fame during the fadeout, incidentally, which Lennon and Slick had both previously played on.

== Reception ==
Pop historian Robert Rodriguez considers "Cleanup Time" one of the weakest songs on Double Fantasy, claiming that it sounds like Lennon is "trying too damn hard to sell us something." Music lecturers Ken Bielen and Ben Urish claim it has a sound reminiscent of the soul music issued by Stax Records and Atlantic Records during the mid-60s, particularly noting the horn parts.

== Personnel ==
The musicians who performed on the original recording were as follows:

- John Lennon – vocals, rhythm guitar
- Earl Slick, Hugh McCracken – lead guitar
- Tony Levin – bass
- George Small – keyboards
- Howard Johnson, Grant Hunderford, J.D Parran, Seldon Powell, George 'Young' Opalisky, Roger Rosenberg, David Tofani, Ronald Tooley – horns
- Andy Newmark – drums
- Arthur Jenkins – percussion
