= Every Man Has a Woman =

Studio album by Various Artists
- Released: 1984
- Recorded: 1980–1984
- Genres: Pop, new wave, rock
- Length: 39:14
- Label: Polygram
- Producer: Various

Singles from Every Man Has a Woman
- 1. "Every Man Has a Woman Who Loves Him" Released: 16 November 1984

Professional ratings
Review scores
Source	Rating
Allmusic	2.5/5 stars

Every Man Has a Woman is a tribute album to Yoko Ono for her 50th birthday. It contains covers of her songs from the albums Approximately Infinite Universe (1973), Double Fantasy (1980), Season of Glass (1981), and It's Alright (I See Rainbows) (1982). The album was purportedly one of John Lennon's projects, but Lennon was murdered before he could see its completion. The liner notes for the vinyl LP feature an essay by Ono entitled "A Crystal Ball".

Another tribute album to Ono in a similar vein entitled Yes, I'm a Witch was released to very positive reviews in 2007, featuring such artists as Peaches, Cat Power and The Flaming Lips.

== Track listing ==
All tracks are written by Yoko Ono.

No.	Title	Performing Artist	Length
1.	"Every Man Has a Woman Who Loves Him"	John Lennon	3:32
2.	"Silver Horse"	Harry Nilsson	3:07
3.	"I'm Moving On"	Eddie Money	2:47
4.	"Nobody See Me Like You Do"	Rosanne Cash	3:23
5.	"Dogtown"	Alternating Boxes	3:26
6.	"Goodbye Sadness"	Roberta Flack	3:22
7.	"Walking on Thin Ice"	Elvis Costello And The Attractions & The TKO Horns	3:46
8.	"Wake Up"	Trio	2:22
9.	"Dream Love"	Harry Nilsson	3:46
10.	"Now or Never"	Spirit Choir	3:44
11.	"Loneliness"	Harry Nilsson	3:42
12.	"It's Alright"	Sean Ono Lennon	3:20

== Singles ==
- "Every Man Has a Woman Who Loves Him" (John Lennon) / "It's Alright" (Sean Lennon) (7")
- "Silver Horse" / "Dream Love" (Harry Nilsson) (7")
- "Loneliness" (Harry Nilsson) (7")
- "Dogtown" (Alternating Boxes) (12")

== Personnel ==
Credits are adapted from the album sleeve.

"Every Man Has a Woman Who Loves Him"

- John Lennon - lead vocals, keyboards, guitar, production
- Earl Slick - guitar
- Hugh McCracken - guitar
- Tony Levin - bass guitar
- George Small - keyboards
- Ed Walsh - synthesizer
- Andy Newmark - drums
- Arthur Jenkins, Jr. - percussion

"Silver Horse"

- Harry Nilsson - lead vocals, arrangement, production
- Rick Riccio - flute, engineer, arrangement, mixing, production
- Frank Capp - contractor
- Randy Kerber - keyboards
- Jim Keltner - acoustic and electronic drums
- Bobby Keys - saxophone
- Mike Hatcher - engineer

"I'm Moving On"

- Eddie Money - lead vocals, production
- John Nelson - guitar
- Steve Farris - guitar
- Ralph Carter - bass
- Gary Ferguson - percussion
- Randy Nichols - keyboards
- Andy Johns - engineer, production
- David Ahlert - assistant engineer

"Nobody Sees Me Like You Do"

- Rosanne Cash - lead vocals, production
- Hank DeVito - twelve-string guitar, electric guitar
- Vince Gill - electric guitar
- David Hungate - bass guitar
- James Stroud - drums
- Shane Keister - synthesizer
- Rodney Crowell - production
- Joe Bogan - engineer

"Dogtown"

- Guy Manganiello - lead vocals, synthesizer, arrangement, production
- Eric Denton - keyboards
- Earle Mankey - engineer

"Goodbye Sadness"

- Roberta Flack - lead vocals, production
- Diva Gray - backing vocals
- Hilda Harris - backing vocals
- Ullanda McCullough - backing vocals
- Ralph MacDonald - production

"Walking on Thin Ice"

- Allen Toussaint - production

"Wake Up"

- Stephan Rammler - lead vocals, keyboards
- Gert Krawinkel - guitar
- Peter Behrens - drums
- Das Weilerswister Männerquartett - choir
- Klaus Voormann - production
- Michael Barbiero - mixing
- René Tinner - engineer

"Dream Love"

- Harry Nilsson - lead vocals, backing vocals, arrangement, production
- Rick Riccio - flute, arrangement, engineer, mixing, production
- Frank Capp - contractor
- Randy Kerber - keyboards
- Jim Keltner - acoustic and electric drums
- Mike Hatcher - engineer

"Now or Never"

- John Lennon - guitar, production
- Yoko Ono - production
- Plastic Ono Band - production
- Elephants Memory - production
  - Wayne Gabriel, Jr. - guitar
  - Gary Van Scyoc - guitar
  - Adam Ippolito - piano
  - George Young - saxophone
  - Stan Bronstein - saxophone
  - Richard Frank, Jr. - drums, percussion

"Loneliness"

- Harry Nilsson - lead vocals, arrangement, production
- Rick Riccio - keyboards, engineer, mixing, arrangement, production
- Carmen Twillie - backing vocals
- Julia Tillman Waters - backing vocals
- Maxine Willard Waters - backing vocals
- Val McCallum - guitar
- Desi Sheraton - handclaps
- Frank Capp - contractor
- Randy Kerber - keyboards
- Jim Keltner - acoustic and electric drums
- Mike Hatcher - engineer

"It's Alright"

- Sean Lennon - lead vocals, production
- Adrienne Albert - backing vocals
- Carl Tharps - backing vocals
- Jonathan Paley - backing vocals
- Kenny Seymour - backing vocals
- Peter Cannarozzi - synthesizer
- Jimmy Maelen - percussion
- Michael Barbiero - engineer
- Paul Stubblebine - engineer
- Yoko Ono - production
