= I'm Moving On (Yoko Ono song) =

Song by Yoko Ono

from the album Double Fantasy
- Released: 17 November 1980
- Recorded: 1980
- Genre: Rock
- Length: 2:20
- Label: Geffen
- Songwriter(s): Yoko Ono
- Producer(s): Yoko Ono, John Lennon, Jack Douglas

Double Fantasy track listing
- 14 tracks Side one: 1. "(Just Like) Starting Over"; 2. "Kiss Kiss Kiss"; 3. "Cleanup Time"; 4. "Give Me Something"; 5. "I'm Losing You"; 6. "I'm Moving On"; 7. "Beautiful Boy (Darling Boy)"; Side two: 8. "Watching the Wheels"; 9. "Yes, I'm Your Angel"; 10. "Woman"; 11. "Beautiful Boys"; 12. "Dear Yoko"; 13. "Every Man Has a Woman Who Loves Him"; 14. "Hard Times Are Over"

"I'm Moving On"

Single by Yoko Ono

from the album Onomix
- Released: 25 September 2012
- Genre: Dance
- Label: Mind Train / Twisted
- Producer(s): Yoko Ono

Yoko Ono singles chronology
"She Gets Down on Her Knees" (2012)	"I'm Moving On" (2012)	"Hold Me" (2013)

"I'm Moving On" is a song by Yoko Ono. It was originally recorded for 1980's Double Fantasy album, with John Lennon. A remix was released on iTunes on 25 September 2012. The remix debuted at number 39, and peaked at number 4.

== Recording ==
During the Double Fantasy sessions, on August 12, 1980, a version of "I'm Moving On" was recorded with a lineup that included Cheap Trick guitarist Rick Nielsen and Cheap Trick drummer Bun E. Carlos. Tony Levin played bass guitar, since Cheap Trick bassist Tom Petersson had recently left the group. The same lineup also recorded a version of Lennon's "I'm Losing You" the same day. Neither song was released on Double Fantasy in their Cheap Trick-backed version. Possible reasons for their exclusions are that Cheap Trick's management may have wanted too much money, or that Lennon believed that the performances were more "heavy" than he wanted. On August 26, a revised version of "I'm Moving On" was recorded with the regular Double Fantasy session musicians consisting of Hugh McCracken and Earl Slick on guitar, Tony Levin on bass guitar, George Small on keyboards, Arthur Jenkins on percussion and Andy Newmark on drums. Ono recorded her lead vocal on September 19.

== Lyrics and music ==
"I'm Moving On" is in some ways a companion piece to Lennon's "I'm Losing You," which immediately precedes on Double Fantasy. The songs are linked musically by series of electronic beeps and by a guitar lick played by Earl Slick, and share the same rhythm. Producer Jack Douglas originally wanted the songs to be linked via a drum pattern he wanted Bun E. Carlos to play. "I'm Losing You" expresses Lennon's pain at the thought of losing Yoko Ono during a difficult time in their marriage. "I'm Moving On" also addresses the possible loss of their relationship, but expresses her feelings of independence and willingness to say farewell. Basically, "I'm Moving On" rebuffs Lennon's plea in "I'm Losing You." The singer accuses her lover of being false, objecting to his "window smile," and warns him that she has no desire for intimacy with lines such as "don't stick your finger in my pie." Rock journalist Paul Du Noyer calls "I'm Moving On" an "angry song" expressing a "harsh goodbye." Ono stated to David Sheff of Playboy Magazine that the song is about "the sense of 'Well, I've had enough. I'm moving on.' But it's not about any specific incident. It's just the feeling: 'I don't want to play games. I like everything straight.' That's a feeling I have had. I'm proud of the song."

== Other versions ==
In 2007, a version of "I'm Moving On" appeared on Ono's album Yes, I'm a Witch. On this version, Ono was backed by The Sleepy Jackson. Allmusic critic Thom Jurek doesn't think this "synthetic disco take" works very well for the song.

== Track list ==
Remixes

1. "I'm Moving On" (Papercha$er radio mix) – 4:01
2. "I'm Moving On" (Papercha$er vocal mix) – 6:08
3. "I'm Moving On" (Papercha$er Money mix) – 6:08
4. "I'm Moving On" (Papercha$er remix) – 6:08
5. "I'm Moving On" (Papercha$er instrumental) – 6:08
6. "I'm Moving On" (Ralphi Rosario Radio Mix) – 3:56
7. "I'm Moving On" (Ralphi Rosario vox mix) – 7:51
8. "I'm Moving On" (Ralphi Rosario dub) – 7:51
9. "I'm Moving On" (Sted-E and Hybrid Heights remix) – 5:28
10. "I'm Moving On" (Sted-E and Hybrid Heights dub) – 5:44

Remixes Part 2

1. "I'm Moving On" (Starkillers remix) – 5:37
2. "I'm Moving On" (Starkillers dub) – 5:27
3. "I'm Moving On" (Superchumbo remix) – 7:03
4. "I'm Moving On" (Superchumbo dub) – 6:36
5. "I'm Moving On" (Dave Aude club mix) – 5:32
6. "I'm Moving On" (Dave Aude dub) – 5:47
7. "I'm Moving On" (Dave Aude radio edit) – 3:44
8. "I'm Moving On" (Frankie & Eric's directors cut mix) – 8:47
9. "I'm Moving On" (Frankie & Eric's directors cut dub) – 6:39

== Charts ==
=== Weekly charts ===
Chart (2012)	Position
US Hot Dance Club Songs (Billboard)	4
Global Dance Tracks (Billboard)	34
