= Instant Karma: The Amnesty International Campaign to Save Darfur =

Compilation album by various artists

Compilation album by Various artists
- Released: June 12, 2007
- Genres: Pop; rock
- Label: Warner Bros./Amnesty International/Art for Amnesty
- Producers: Jeff Ayeroff, Larry Cox & Bill Shipsey (Executive Producers); Helen Garrett, Vanessa Moss, Robin Raj, Karen Schneider & Julie Yannatta (Co-Executive Producers); Individual Song Production Credits Listed Below

Singles from Instant Karma: The Amnesty International Campaign to Save Darfur
- 1. "#9 Dream" Released: March 13, 2007; 2. "Whatever Gets You thru the Night" Released: April 17, 2007; 3. "Working Class Hero" Released: May 1, 2007; 4. "Instant Karma!" Released: June 30, 2007

Professional ratings
Review scores
Source	Rating
AllMusic	2/5 stars
Entertainment Weekly	B
IGN	6.2/10
MSN Music (Consumer Guide)	(choice cut)
Pioneer Press	3/5 stars
PopMatters	6/10 stars
Rolling Stone	3/5 stars

Instant Karma: The Amnesty International Campaign to Save Darfur is a compilation album of various artists covering songs of John Lennon to benefit Amnesty International's campaign to alleviate the crisis in Darfur. The album and campaign is part of Amnesty International's global "Make Some Noise" project.

== Release ==
Lennon's songs and music publishing royalties were donated to Amnesty International by Yoko Ono. Amnesty International used the songs to start the "Make Some Noise" project, which later led to the subsidiary campaign "Instant Karma". Eventually, enough momentum was achieved through the project to amount to an album.

Ono said: "It's wonderful that, through this campaign, music that is so familiar to many people of my era will now be embraced by a whole new generation. John's music set out to inspire change, and in standing up for human rights, and selling more records, we really can make the world a better place."

Larry Cox, executive director of Amnesty International USA, added: "We know music's power to unite and inspire people. With hundreds of thousands dead, millions driven from their burned out villages and rape being used as a tactic in the Darfur conflict, the world needs a mass mobilization demanding action and justice. The 'Instant Karma' campaign combines John Lennon's passionate desire for us to imagine a more peaceful world with Amnesty International's expertise in achieving justice. 'Instant Karma' allows ordinary people to lend their hand in saving lives – a notion we think would make John proud."

"John Lennon was not just a famous Beatle, he was the social conscience of his generation," says Jeff Ayeroff, one of the album's executive producers. "By reinterpreting his music and reintroducing it to a new generation, we shine a light on the darkness that is Darfur. Yoko Ono's gift of John's music to Amnesty International, whose work points out the pain and injustice in the world, is a true beacon of light. Give peace a chance is all we are saying."

Proceeds from CD and digital sales will support Amnesty International and its campaign to focus attention and mobilize activism around the urgent catastrophe in Darfur, and other human rights crises. It was released in the US on June 12 and the UK on June 25, 2007.

== Track listings ==
=== US release ===
There were two CD versions released in the United States. The primary version was a two-disc set containing 23 tracks. The second version was a two-disc set sold only at Borders retail outlets that was identical to the primary version save that disc 2 contained an additional two bonus tracks.

There was an iTunes-only expanded digital release in the United States that added 11 further tracks to the 23 tracks on the primary CD release – making for a 34-track digital set.

==== Disc one ====
#	Title	Performer(s)	Producer(s)	Time
1	"Instant Karma!"	U2	Larry Mullen Jr. and Tal Herzberg	3:14
2	"#9 Dream"	R.E.M.	David Barbe & R.E.M.	4:38
3	"Mother"	Christina Aguilera (featuring Bigelf)	Linda Perry	4:48
4	"Give Peace a Chance"	Aerosmith featuring Sierra Leone's Refugee All Stars	Marti Frederiksen	4:35
5	"Cold Turkey"	Lenny Kravitz	Lenny Kravitz	4:43
6	"Whatever Gets You Thru the Night"	Los Lonely Boys	Los Lonely Boys	3:35
7	"I'm Losing You"	Corinne Bailey Rae	Steve Chrisanthou	4:01
8	"Gimme Some Truth"	Jakob Dylan featuring Dhani Harrison	Tony Berg	3:53
9	"Oh, My Love"	Jackson Browne	Jackson Browne	2:39
10	"Imagine"	Avril Lavigne	Butch Walker	3:12
11	"Nobody Told Me"	Big & Rich	Adam Shoenfeld	3:30
12	"Jealous Guy"	Youssou N'Dour	Prince N'Dour	3:59

==== Disc two ====
#	Title	Performer(s)	Producer(s)	Time
1	"Working Class Hero"	Green Day	Green Day	4:25
2	"Power to the People"	Black Eyed Peas	Will.I.Am	3:35
3	"Imagine"	Jack Johnson	Jack Johnson & Robert Carranza	3:40
4	"Beautiful Boy (Darling Boy)"	Ben Harper	Ben Harper	3:48
5	"Isolation"	Snow Patrol	Garrett "Jacknife" Lee	2:36
6	"Watching the Wheels"	Matisyahu & Dub Trio	David Kahne	3:19
7	"Grow Old with Me"	The Postal Service	Jimmy Tamborello & Benjamin Gibbard	2:30
8	"Gimme Some Truth"	Jaguares	Saúl Hernández, Alfonso André & Adrian Belew	3:08
9	"(Just Like) Starting Over"	The Flaming Lips	The Flaming Lips	3:36
10	"God"	Jack's Mannequin featuring Mick Fleetwood	Jim Wirt, Andrew McMahon & Robert "Raw" Anderson	4:20
11	"Real Love"	Regina Spektor	Regina Spektor & Joe Mendelson	3:57

===== Borders exclusive bonus tracks =====
(Only available on the special edition of the album courtesy of Borders on Disc Two)

#	Title	Performer(s)	Time
12	"Imagine"	Willie Nelson	3:33
13	"Happy Xmas (War Is Over)"	Angelique Kidjo	3:04

===== iTunes bonus tracks =====
(Only available for download on the expanded iTunes edition of the album)

#	Title	Performer(s)	Time
1	"Instant Karma!"	Duran Duran	3:56
2	"Jealous Guy"	Deftones	4:07
3	"Mind Games"	Gavin Rossdale	4:13
4	"Oh My Love"	Yellowcard	3:20
5	"Crippled Inside"	Widespread Panic	4:06
6	"Borrowed Time"	O.A.R.	5:55
7	"Woman"	Ben Jelen	3:41
8	"Imagine"	Me'Shell NdegéOcello	3:16
9	"Well Well Well"	Rocky Dawuni	5:00
10	"Mother"	Emmanuel Jal	6:03
11	"I Don't Wanna Face It"	The Fab Faux	2:49

All songs written by Lennon except "Imagine", "Oh, My Love" and "Happy Xmas (War Is Over)" written by Lennon–Ono

=== International release (outside the United States) ===
The CD version released outside the United States was a two-disc set containing 28 tracks.

==== Disc one ====
#	Title	Performer(s)	Producer(s)	Time
1	"Instant Karma!"	U2	Tal Herzberg; additional production by Larry Mullen Jr. & The Edge	3:14
2	"#9 Dream"	R.E.M.	David Barbe & R.E.M.	4:38
3	"Mother"	Christina Aguilera (featuring Bigelf)	Linda Perry	4:48
4	"Give Peace a Chance"	Aerosmith featuring Sierra Leone's Refugee All Stars	Marti Frederiksen	4:35
5	"Cold Turkey"	Lenny Kravitz	Lenny Kravitz	4:43
6	"Love"	The Cure	The Cure	3:16
7	"I'm Losing You"	Corinne Bailey Rae	Steve Chrisanthou	4:01
8	"Gimme Some Truth"	Jakob Dylan featuring Dhani Harrison	Tony Berg	3:53
9	"Oh, My Love"	Jackson Browne	Jackson Browne	2:39
10	"One Day At A Time"	The Raveonettes	Richard Gottehrer	3:22
11	"Imagine"	Avril Lavigne	Butch Walker	3:12
12	"Nobody Told Me"	Big & Rich	Adam Shoenfeld	3:30
13	"Mind Games"	Eskimo Joe	Matt Lovell, Eskimo Joe	4:04
14	"Jealous Guy"	Youssou N'Dour	Prince N'Dour	3:59

==== Disc two ====
#	Title	Performer(s)	Producer(s)	Time
1	"Working Class Hero"	Green Day	Green Day	4:24
2	"Power to the People"	Black Eyed Peas	Will.I.Am	3:35
3	"Imagine"	Jack Johnson	Jack Johnson & Robert Carranza	3:40
4	"Beautiful Boy (Darling Boy)"	Ben Harper	Ben Harper	3:48
5	"Isolation"	Snow Patrol	Garrett "Jacknife" Lee	2:36
6	"Watching the Wheels"	Matisyahu	David Kahne	3:19
7	"Grow Old With Me"	The Postal Service	Jimmy Tamborello & Benjamin Gibbard	2:30
8	"Gimme Some Truth"	Jaguares	Saúl Hernández, Alfonso André & Adrian Belew	3:08
9	"(Just Like) Starting Over"	The Flaming Lips	The Flaming Lips	3:36
10	"God"	Jack's Mannequin featuring Mick Fleetwood	Jim Wirt, Andrew McMahon & Robert "Raw" Anderson	4:20
11	"Instant Karma!"	Duran Duran	Duran Duran and Paul Logus	3:55
12	"#9 Dream"	a-ha	a-ha	4:06
13	"Instant Karma!"	Tokio Hotel	Dave Roth, Peter Hoffman, Pat Benzer & David Jost	3:09
14	"Real Love"	Regina Spektor	Regina Spektor & Joe Mendelson	3:57

=== Instant Karma: The Amnesty International Campaign to Save Darfur (The Complete Recordings) ===
On October 8, 2007, iTunes released a collection of 61 recordings, including 23 previously unreleased tracks contributed to the project.

Notwithstanding the title The Complete Recordings there were some other tracks prepared for the project that were not included on this digital release. (See below).

This is the listing of the 61 tracks that comprise the iTunes digital release The Complete Recordings:

1. Nobody Told Me – Abdel Wright
2. Give Peace a Chance – Aerosmith featuring Sierra Leone's Refugee All Stars
3. Imagine – Afroreggae
4. No. 9 Dream – a-ha
5. Happy Xmas (War Is Over) – Angelique Kidjo with Naima
6. Love – Audrey de Montigny
7. Imagine – Avril Lavigne
8. Oh Yoko – Barenaked Ladies
9. Beautiful Boy – Ben Harper
10. Woman – Ben Jelen
11. Nobody Told Me – Big & Rich
12. Power to the People – Black Eyed Peas
13. Mother – Christina Aguilera featuring Bigelf
14. I'm Losing You – Corinne Bailey Rae
15. Watching the Wheels – David Usher
16. Jealous Guy – Deftones
17. Power to the People – Dj Emjay & The Atari Babies
18. Hold On – DobaCaracol
19. Instant Karma – Duran Duran
20. Oh My Love – Elvira Nikolaisen
21. Mother – Emmanuel Jal
22. Mind Games – Eskimo Joe
23. I Don't Want to Face It – The Fab Faux
24. Look At Me – Finger Eleven
25. (Just Like) Starting Over – The Flaming Lips
26. Beautiful Boy – Freshly Ground
27. Mind Games – Gavin Rossdale
28. Working Class Hero – Green Day
29. Imagine – Jack Johnson
30. God – Jack's Mannequin featuring Mick Fleetwood
31. Oh, My Love – Jackson Browne
32. Gimme Some Truth – Jaguares
33. Gimme Some Truth (Spanish) – Jaguares
34. Gimme Some Truth – Jakob Dylan featuring Dhani Harrison
35. Imagine – James Stewart
36. Bless You – Leeroy
37. Cold Turkey – Lenny Kravitz
38. Whatever Gets You Thru the Night (Peu Importe Si tu Passe la Nuit) – Les Trois Accords
39. Whatever Gets You Thru the Night – Los Lonely Boys
40. I'm Losing You – Madrugada
41. Watching the Wheels – Matisyahu
42. Imagine – Me'Shell Ndegeocello
43. Borrowed Time – O.A.R.
44. Woman – Paddy Casey
45. Grow Old With Me – The Postal Service
46. Real Love – Regina Spektor
47. No.9 Dream – R.E.M.
48. Well Well Well – Rocky Dawuni
49. Isolation – Snow Patrol
50. Love – The Cure
51. One Day at a Time – The Raveonettes
52. Instant Karma – The Waking Eyes
53. Working Class Hero – Tina Dickow
54. Instant Karma – Tokio Hotel
55. John Sinclair – Trevor Menear
56. Instant Karma – U2
57. Give Peace a Chance – The Voices of Asia
58. Crippled Inside – Widespread Panic
59. Imagine – Willie Nelson
60. Oh, My Love – Yellowcard
61. Jealous Guy – Youssou N'Dour

== Unreleased recordings ==
The Instant Karma project and the Make Some Noise initiative that preceded it stimulated a desire by many artists to contribute recordings. In addition to the 61 tracks released through the various CD and digital configurations of Instant Karma there were 8 tracks created for the project that did not get included in any format. One track was released subsequently by Amnesty as a separate high-profile project. (Detailed below). These are the 7 tracks created for the Instant Karma project that have not to date been released by Amnesty:

1. "Mind Games" – MIA.
2. "Give Peace a Chance" – Puppetmastaz featuring Angie Reed
3. "Imagine" – Josh Groban
4. "Jealous Guy" – K-OS
5. "Working Class Hero" – Racoon
6. "Instant Karma!" – The Sheer
7. "Happy Xmas (War Is Over)" – Maroon 5

== Ozzy Osbourne tribute to Lennon ==
In 2007, Ozzy Osbourne recorded a version of "How?" specially for the Instant Karma produced by Mark Hudson. For reasons never publicly disclosed the recording was not incorporated in any of the released versions of the album.

In 2010, Osbourne was working on an unrelated TV project with longtime Amnesty producer Martin Lewis, who three decades earlier had instigated Amnesty's outreach to rock musicians by recruiting and producing Pete Townshend, Sting, Eric Clapton, Jeff Beck, Bob Geldof and others for Amnesty.

Lewis encouraged Osbourne to re-purpose his unused Lennon recording for a new project saluting Lennon. Osbourne agreed to donate his track for a special iTunes charity single benefiting Amnesty to be released in October 2010 in conjunction with multiple celebrations of the 70th anniversary of Lennon's birth including an all-star concert for Amnesty in New York City.

Osbourne then made a special music video shot in Manhattan paying his very personal tribute to Lennon, produced by Lewis and directed by filmmaker Ernie Fritz.

The charity release was blessed by Yoko Ono who stated "John's spirit and influence is stronger than ever. John shared a common purpose with Amnesty International - shining a light on wrongs and campaigning to protect people's rights. We all shine on!"
