= Woman (John Lennon song) =

1981 single by John Lennon

Single by John Lennon

from the album Double Fantasy
- B-side: "Beautiful Boys" (Yoko Ono)
- Released: 12 January 1981
- Recorded: 5 August, 27 August, 8 September, 22 September 1980
- Genre: Soft rock
- Length: 3:32
- Label: Geffen
- Songwriter: John Lennon
- Producers: John Lennon; Yoko Ono; Jack Douglas

John Lennon singles chronology
"(Just Like) Starting Over" (1980)	"Woman" (1981)	"Watching the Wheels" (1981)

Double Fantasy track listing
- 14 tracks Side one: 1. "(Just Like) Starting Over"; 2. "Kiss Kiss Kiss"; 3. "Cleanup Time"; 4. "Give Me Something"; 5. "I'm Losing You"; 6. "I'm Moving On"; 7. "Beautiful Boy (Darling Boy)"; Side two: 8. "Watching the Wheels"; 9. "Yes, I'm Your Angel"; 10. "Woman"; 11. "Beautiful Boys"; 12. "Dear Yoko"; 13. "Every Man Has a Woman Who Loves Him"; 14. "Hard Times Are Over"

Music video
- "Woman" on YouTube

"Woman" is a song written and performed by English singer John Lennon from his 1980 album Double Fantasy. The track was chosen by Lennon to be the second single released from the Double Fantasy album, and it was the first Lennon single issued after his murder on 8 December 1980. The B-side of the single is Yoko Ono's song "Beautiful Boys".

Lennon wrote "Woman" as an ode to Ono and to all women.

== Background ==
The track begins with Lennon whispering, "For the other half of the sky", a reference to a quote attributed to Mao Zedong, "Women hold up half the sky". In an interview for Rolling Stone magazine on 5 December 1980, three days before his murder, John Lennon said that the song "came about because, one sunny afternoon in Bermuda, it suddenly hit me what women do for us. Not just what my Yoko does for me, although I was thinking in those personal terms ... but any truth is universal. What dawned on me was everything I was taking for granted. Women really are the other half of the sky, as I whisper at the beginning of the song. It's a 'we' or it ain't anything." In that same interview, Lennon said that "Woman" was his most Beatlesque song on Double Fantasy and that the track is a "grown-up version" of his Beatles song "Girl".

On 5 June 1981, Geffen re-released "Woman" as a single as part of their "Back to Back Hits" series, with the B-side "(Just Like) Starting Over". In the United Kingdom, "Woman" replaced Lennon's 1971 track "Imagine" at number 1.

A promotional film for the song was created by Yoko Ono in January 1981. Throughout most of the video, Lennon and Ono are seen walking through Central Park near what would become Strawberry Fields across from The Dakota. This footage was directed by photographer Ethan Russell on 26 November 1980. Other footage of Ono alone, along with photos and newspaper coverage of Lennon's murder, were also included.

== Reception ==
Record World described it as a "simple, introspective love song" and said that the power its last line − "I love you now and forever" − magnifies the song's impact.

Ultimate Classic Rock critic Stephen Lewis rated it as Lennon's greatest solo love song.

== Chart performance ==
The single debuted at number three in Lennon's native UK, then moving to number two and finally reaching number one, where it spent two weeks, knocking off the top spot his own re-released "Imagine". In the US the single peaked at number two on the Billboard Hot 100 (kept out of the top spot by REO Speedwagon's hit "Keep On Loving You" and Blondie's hit "Rapture") while reaching number one on the Cashbox Top 100.

== Charts ==
=== Weekly charts ===
Chart (1981)	Peak position
Australia (Kent Music Report)	4
Austria (Ö3 Austria Top 40)	3
Canada Top Singles (RPM)	1
Finland (Suomen virallinen lista)	11
Ireland (IRMA)	1
Italy (Musica e Dischi)	6
Luxembourg (Radio Luxembourg)	1
Netherlands (Dutch Top 40)	11
Norway (VG-lista)	5
New Zealand (RIANZ)	1
South Africa (Springbok)	4
Switzerland (Schweizer Hitparade)	2
UK Singles (Official Charts)	1
US Billboard Hot 100	2
US Adult Contemporary (Billboard)	4
US Cash Box Top 100	1
West Germany (Official German Charts)	4
Zimbabwe (ZIMA)	1

=== Year-end charts ===
Chart (1981)	Rank
Australia (Kent Music Report)	34
Canada	15
Italy	34
New Zealand	10
US Billboard Hot 100	21
US Cash Box Top 100	16

=== All-time charts ===
Chart (1958–2018)	Position
US Billboard Hot 100	400

== Certifications ==
Region	Certification	Certified units/sales
New Zealand (RMNZ)	Gold	10,000^{*}
United Kingdom (BPI)	Silver	250,000^{^}
United States (RIAA)	Gold	1,000,000^{^}
^{*} Sales figures based on certification alone.^{^} Shipments figures based on certification alone.

== Personnel ==
- John Lennon – vocals, acoustic guitar
- Earl Slick, Hugh McCracken – lead guitar
- Tony Levin – bass guitar
- George Small – piano, Rhodes piano, Prophet-5 synthesizer
- Andy Newmark – drums
- Arthur Jenkins – percussion
- Michelle Simpson, Cassandra Wooten, Cheryl Mason Jacks, Eric Troyer – backing vocals

== See also ==
- List of posthumous number-one singles (UK)
