= (Just Like) Starting Over =

1980 single by John Lennon

Single by John Lennon

from the album Double Fantasy
- B-side: "Kiss Kiss Kiss" (Yoko Ono)
- Released: 23 October 1980 (US); 24 October 1980 (UK)
- Recorded: 9 August 1980
- Studio: The Hit Factory, New York City
- Genre: Pop rock; doo-wop; rock and roll
- Length: 3:54
- Label: Geffen
- Songwriter: John Lennon
- Producers: John Lennon; Yoko Ono; Jack Douglas

John Lennon singles chronology
"Stand by Me" (1975)	"(Just Like) Starting Over" (1980)	"Woman" (1981)

Double Fantasy track listing
- 14 tracks Side one: 1. "(Just Like) Starting Over"; 2. "Kiss Kiss Kiss"; 3. "Cleanup Time"; 4. "Give Me Something"; 5. "I'm Losing You"; 6. "I'm Moving On"; 7. "Beautiful Boy (Darling Boy)"; Side two: 8. "Watching the Wheels"; 9. "Yes, I'm Your Angel"; 10. "Woman"; 11. "Beautiful Boys"; 12. "Dear Yoko"; 13. "Every Man Has a Woman Who Loves Him"; 14. "Hard Times Are Over"

Licensed audio
- "(Just Like) Starting Over" on YouTube

Professional ratings
Review scores
Source	Rating
Billboard	(unrated)

"(Just Like) Starting Over" (originally titled "Starting Over") is a song written and performed by John Lennon. It was released as a single on 24 October 1980 in the United Kingdom, with Yoko Ono's "Kiss Kiss Kiss" as the B-side. It reached number one in both the US and UK after Lennon was murdered on 8 December 1980, and achieved the Christmas number two position in the latter country. It was Lennon's first single from the album Double Fantasy and the final released by him during his lifetime.

== Background ==
"(Just Like) Starting Over" was the first single released from Double Fantasy and the first new recording Lennon had released since he left the music industry in 1975. It was chosen by Lennon not because he felt it was the best track on the album, but because it was the most appropriate following his five-year absence from the recording industry. He referred to it during production as the "Elvis/Orbison" track, as he "tongue in cheek" impersonated their vocal styles. Lennon explained, "All through the taping of 'Starting Over,' I was calling what I was doing 'Elvis Orbison': 'I want you I need only the lonely.' I'm a born-again rocker, I feel that refreshed, and I'm going right back to my roots." At the start of the 2010 "Stripped Down" version of the song, Lennon says "this one's for Gene, and Eddie, and Elvis... and Buddy."

== Composition ==
Although its origins were in unfinished demo compositions like "Don't Be Crazy" and "My Life", it was one of the last songs to be completed in time for the Double Fantasy sessions. "We didn't hear it until the last day of rehearsal," producer Jack Douglas said in 2005. Lennon finished the song while on holiday in Bermuda, and recorded it at The Hit Factory in New York City just weeks later. The song was originally titled "Starting Over"; however, "(Just Like)" was added prior to its release because of its similarity to Dolly Parton's "Starting Over Again" which had topped the US Country Charts earlier in the year. The chiming bell that opens the song was a deliberate allusion to the heavy tolling church bell that opens Lennon's 1970 song "Mother", illustrating how far Lennon had come in ten years.

While commercial releases of the song (original 45 rpm singles, LPs and compact discs) run a length of three minutes and 54 seconds, a promotional 12-inch vinyl single originally issued to radio stations features a longer fadeout, officially running at four minutes 17 seconds.

Musicologist Walter Everett noted melodic similarities between a portion of the song and the Beach Boys' 1964 single "Don't Worry Baby".

== Recording ==
Lennon recorded "(Just Like) Starting Over" on 9 August 1980 at The Hit Factory. The track was mixed at the Record Plant on 25–26 September 1980.

== Release and reception ==
The song is Lennon's biggest solo hit in the US, staying at number 1 for five weeks. Before Lennon was murdered in New York City on 8 December 1980, the single had reached number 3 on the US charts. It reached number 1 for the week ending 27 December. Billboard ranked it at the No. 4 song for 1981. The song also reached number 1 on the Cashbox Top 100.

In the UK, it had peaked at number 8 in the charts and had fallen to position number 21 before Lennon's murder propelled it to number 1. It was overtaken to the Christmas Number One Single rank by the St Winifred's School Choir's "There's No One Quite Like Grandma," finishing at number 2 on that list. This was particularly polarising as Lennon had been murdered three weeks prior. After two weeks at number one, a previous Lennon song, "Imagine", replaced it. By 6 January 1981, there were three Lennon songs in the UK top 5, a feat that remained unequalled for 35 years until Justin Bieber accomplished this in January 2016.

Billboard magazine considered "(Just Like) Starting Over" to be an "uptempo, fresh sounding rocker," praising the "irresistible melody and lyric line," the "exceptional rhythm unit" as well as Lennon's vocal performance. Record World said that "John steps briskly into the mainstream with this glorious pop-rocker."

In 2013, Billboard ranked it as the 62nd biggest hit of all time on the Billboard Hot 100 chart.

Stereogum contributors Timothy and Elizabeth Bracy rated it as Lennon's seventh best solo song, saying that it "finds him in throwback mode, delightfully evoking the doo-wop of his childhood on an uncharacteristically winsome ode to rejuvenated love." Ultimate Classic Rock critic Stephen Lewis rated it as Lennon's seventh greatest solo love song, saying that "The undeniably catchy rock and roll song – a tribute to past rock and rollers – appeals to ears and hearts, with a solid groove and an optimistic and wistful lyric that is honest, without becoming maudlin."

== Charts ==
=== Weekly charts ===
Chart (1980–1981)	Peak position
Australia (Kent Music Report)	1
Austria (Ö3 Austria Top 40)	1
Belgium (Ultratop 50 Flanders)	6
Canadian RPM Top Singles	1
Finnish Singles Chart	16
Ireland (IRMA)	1
Italy (Musica e Dischi)	8
Luxembourg (Radio Luxembourg)	1
Netherlands (Dutch Top 40)	8
Netherlands (Single Top 100)	14
New Zealand Top 40	2
Norway (VG-lista)	2
South Africa (Springbok)	4
Sweden (Sverigetopplistan)	3
Switzerland (Schweizer Hitparade)	1
UK Singles Chart	1
US Billboard Hot 100	1
US Adult Contemporary (Billboard)	17
West Germany (GfK)	4

Chart (2023)	Peak position
Japan Hot Overseas (Billboard Japan)	20

=== Year-end charts ===
Chart (1980)	Rank
Australia (Kent Music Report)	84
US Cash Box Top 100	57

Chart (1981)	Rank
Australia (Kent Music Report)	18
Canada	21
US Billboard Hot 100	4

=== All-time charts ===
Chart (1958–2013)	Rank
US Billboard Hot 100	68

== Certifications ==
Certifications for (Just Like) Starting Over
Region	Certification	Certified units/sales
Japan (RIAJ) 1997 release	Gold	50,000^{^}
New Zealand (RMNZ)	Gold	10,000^{*}
United Kingdom (BPI)	Gold	500,000^{^}
United States (RIAA)	Gold	1,000,000^{^}
^{*} Sales figures based on certification alone.^{^} Shipments figures based on certification alone.

== Covers ==
The Flaming Lips recorded a version for the benefit album Instant Karma: The Amnesty International Campaign to Save Darfur.

== Personnel ==
- John Lennon – vocals, rhythm guitar
- Earl Slick, Hugh McCracken – lead guitar
- Tony Levin – bass guitar
- George Small – keyboards
- Andy Newmark – drums
- Arthur Jenkins – percussion
- Michelle Simpson, Cassandra Wooten, Cheryl Mason Jacks, Eric Troyer – backing vocals

== See also ==
- List of Billboard Hot 100 number-one singles of 1980
- List of Billboard Hot 100 number-one singles of 1981
- List of posthumous number-one singles (UK)
