= The 30th Annual John Lennon Tribute: Live from the Beacon Theatre, NYC =

Live album by Various artists
- Released: November 15, 2011
- Recorded: November 12, 2010

The 30th Annual John Lennon Tribute: Live from the Beacon Theatre, NYC is a compilation tribute album to John Lennon by various artists, released in November 2011. Proceeds from the album benefit the Japanese Red Cross. Not all songs from the concert are included here, such as Cyndi Lauper's covers of "Across the Universe" and "A Day in the Life".

== Track listing ==
1. Aimee Mann - "Jealous Guy"
2. Jackson Browne - "You've Got to Hide Your Love Away"
3. Patti Smith and Tony Shanahan - "Oh Yoko!"
4. Meshell Ndegeocello - "God"
5. Alejandro Escovedo - "Help! "
6. Shelby Lynne - "Mother"
7. Martin Sexton - "Working Class Hero"
8. Joan Osborne - "Hey Bulldog"
9. Taj Mahal and Vusi Mahlasela - "Watching the Wheels"
10. Keb' Mo' - "In My Life"
11. Taj Mahal with Deva Mahal and Steph Brown - "Come Together"
12. Bettye LaVette - "The Word"
13. Rich Pagano - "Power to the People"
14. The Kennedys - "And Your Bird Can Sing"
15. Playing for Change Band - "Instant Karma!"
