= Watching the Wheels =

1981 single by John Lennon

Single by John Lennon

from the album Double Fantasy
- B-side: "Beautiful Boy (Darling Boy)" (US reissue); "Yes, I'm Your Angel" (Yoko Ono) (UK/US)
- Released: 13 March 1981 (US); 27 March 1981 (UK)
- Recorded: 1980
- Genre: Soft rock
- Length: 4:00 (album version); 3:30 (single edit)
- Label: Geffen
- Songwriter: John Lennon
- Producers: John Lennon; Yoko Ono; Jack Douglas

John Lennon singles chronology
"Woman" (1981)	"Watching the Wheels" (1981)	"Love" (1982)

Double Fantasy track listing
- 14 tracks Side one: 1. "(Just Like) Starting Over"; 2. "Kiss Kiss Kiss"; 3. "Cleanup Time"; 4. "Give Me Something"; 5. "I'm Losing You"; 6. "I'm Moving On"; 7. "Beautiful Boy (Darling Boy)"; Side two: 8. "Watching the Wheels"; 9. "Yes, I'm Your Angel"; 10. "Woman"; 11. "Beautiful Boys"; 12. "Dear Yoko"; 13. "Every Man Has a Woman Who Loves Him"; 14. "Hard Times Are Over"

"Watching the Wheels" is a single by John Lennon released posthumously in 1981, after his murder. The B-side features Yoko Ono's "Yes, I'm Your Angel." It was the third and final single released from Lennon and Ono's album Double Fantasy (1980), and reached No. 10 in the US on the Billboard Hot 100 and No. 7 on Cashbox's Top 100. It peaked at number 30 in the UK.

== Writing and recording ==
In "Watching the Wheels" Lennon addresses those who were confounded by his "househusband" years, 1975–1980, during which he retired from the music industry to concentrate on raising his son Sean with Ono. The song features a hammered dulcimer accompanying the lead piano. Though most of the musicians on the album were well-known and oft-recorded session players, the dulcimer was played by Matthew Cunningham. Lennon asked producer Jack Douglas to give the track a "circular" sound, which Douglas associated with hammer dulcimer, but the Musicians' Union had no dulcimer players listed. Douglas invited Cunningham to the session after hearing him busking on the streets of New York with a hammer dulcimer.

== Reception ==
Record World called it "a strong statement of independence and self-assurance that never grows old."

== Artwork ==
The photograph on the cover was taken by Paul Goresh, a fan of Lennon who also took the infamous photo of Lennon signing the copy of Double Fantasy belonging to Mark David Chapman shortly before Chapman murdered Lennon. Both photos were taken at the same place, in front of the Dakota building, which was the site of his 1980 shooting. Later, Chapman was recorded in police custody reciting the line "People say I'm crazy" from the song and was later sampled for use by the band EMF in the track "Lies" from their 1991 album Schubert Dip; however, upon immediate protests by Yoko Ono the sampling was removed on subsequent pressings.

== Personnel ==
- John Lennon – vocals, Yamaha CP-80
- Earl Slick, Hugh McCracken – guitars
- Tony Levin – bass guitar
- George Small – Fender Rhodes
- Eric Troyer – Prophet-5
- Andy Newmark – drums
- Matthew Cunningham – hammer dulcimer
- Arthur Jenkins – percussion
- Michelle Simpson, Cassandra Wooten, Cheryl Mason Jacks, Eric Troyer – backing vocals

== Chart performance ==
=== Weekly charts ===
Chart (1981)	Peak position
Australia KMR	45
Austria	12
Canada RPM	3
Germany	46
Ireland (IRMA)	20
Luxembourg (Radio Luxembourg)	18
New Zealand	44
Switzerland	6
UK	30
U.S. Billboard Hot 100	10
U.S. Billboard Adult Contemporary	6
U.S. Mainstream Rock	25
U.S. Cash Box Top 100	7

=== Year-end charts ===
Chart (1981)	Rank
Canada	26
U.S. Billboard Hot 100	86
U.S. Cash Box	62

== Versions ==
The song has been covered by Gwen Guthrie (1992), The Samples (1997); Paraguayan rock band Deliverans released a Spanish version on the compilation album Lennon Vive: Un tributo del Rock paraguayo (2000), Matisyahu for the benefit album Instant Karma: The Amnesty International Campaign to Save Darfur (2007), and Charly García under the name "Mirando las ruedas" for his album Kill Gil (2010). Patrick Wolf re-arranged the song for a performance at Yoko Ono's Meltdown Festival at the Southbank Centre. Vince Welnick often performed the song in concert in the years following the death of Jerry Garcia which ended Welnick's stint in the Grateful Dead.

An acoustic demo version of the song, performed by Lennon, was included on Disc 4 of the John Lennon Anthology.

In 2020, a cover of the song by Chris Cornell, a huge fan of John Lennon, was included on his posthumous album No One Sings Like You Anymore, Vol. 1.
