= Make Some Noise (campaign) =

Campaign by Amnesty International

Make Some Noise was a campaign by Amnesty International that used music by John Lennon to promote human rights. Well-known artists produced covers of solo-era John Lennon songs exclusively for Amnesty International.

Supported by Yoko Ono, Amnesty created a commemorative CD, featuring new versions of Lennon's songs, recorded by artists such as R.E.M., U2, Green Day, The Black Eyed Peas, The Cure, The Flaming Lips, Snow Patrol, The Postal Service, Maroon 5, Audrey de Montigny and Steve Barakatt, and produced by Warner records. The global launch of Make Some Noise took place on 10 December 2005, International Human Rights Day, with the release of four exclusive singles available as digital downloads. A fundraising album, Instant Karma: The Amnesty International Campaign to Save Darfur, followed.

== Artists and songs ==
Artists participating in Make Some Noise were involved in the promotion of human rights. These covers are several of Lennon's best-known solo-era songs.

CD 1

- U2: Instant Karma
- R.E.M.: #9 Dream
- Christina Aguilera: Mother
- Aerosmith Give Peace a Chance
- Lenny Kravitz: Cold Turkey
- The Cure: Love
- Corinne Bailey Rae: I'm Losing You (live)
- Jakob Dylan & *Dhani Harrison: Gimme Some Truth
- Jackson Browne: Oh, My Love
- The Raveonettes: One Day At A Time
- Avril Lavigne: Imagine
- Big & Rich: Nobody Told Me
- Eskimo Joe: Mind Games
- Youssou N'Dour: Jealous Guy

CD 2

- Green Day: Working Class Hero
- The Black Eyed Peas: Power To The People
- Jack Johnson: Imagine
- Ben Harper: Beautiful Boy
- Snow Patrol: Isolation
- Matisyahu: Watching The Wheels
- The Postal Service: Grow Old With Me
- Jaguares: Gimme Some Truth (Spanish)
- The Flaming Lips: (Just Like) Starting Over
- Jack's Mannequin feat. *Mick Fleetwood: God
- Duran Duran: Instant Karma
- a-ha: #9 Dream
- Tokio Hotel: Instant Karma
- Regina Spektor: Real Love

== Campaigns and actions ==
Make Some Noise encouraged people to take action in a number of campaigns:

- 10,000 paper cranes for freedom of expression in Belarus! Campaign to free prisoner of conscience Zmitser Dashkevich
- Close Guantanamo now! campaign called for individuals across the world to send in their videos add their voice to the global chorus calling for Guantanamo Bay to be closed now.
- Protect the People of Darfur campaign invited people to join the actor Don Cheadle and Snow Patrol in putting pressure on the United Nations to send peace keeping forces to Darfur,
- Control Arms campaign asked individuals to add their face to the Million Faces petition calling for a Global Arms Trade Treaty.
