= Move Over Ms. L =

Song by John Lennon

Single by John Lennon
- A-side: "Stand By Me"
- Released: March 10, 1975
- Recorded: October 21–25, 1974
- Genre: Rock
- Length: 2:56
- Label: Apple
- Songwriter: John Lennon

"Move Over Ms. L" is a song written by John Lennon. It was originally intended to be released on his 1974 album Walls and Bridges but was left off shortly before the album release, and was eventually released as the b-side to Lennon's "Stand by Me" single. In the interim it was released by Keith Moon on his album Two Sides of the Moon. Moon also released it as the B-side of his "Solid Gold" single.

== Recording and release ==
Lennon recorded demos of "Move Over Ms. L" around May and June 1974, first an electric guitar version and then an acoustic guitar version. Lennon recorded the original version of "Move Over Ms. L" that he intended to release on July 15, 1974, using the musicians that performed on Walls and Bridges. It was intended to be included on Walls and Bridges but Lennon decided to leave it out 3 weeks before the album's release. It was originally slotting to be on side 2 of the album, between "Surprise, Surprise" and "What You Got," the latter of which was later shifted to side 1. Lennon rerecorded it in October 1974 and finally released as the B-side of "Stand by Me" in March 1975. It is the only song of Lennon's solo career to be released as a single B-side without appearing on an album during his lifetime. An alternative take that was recorded during the Walls and Bridges sessions was released on John Lennon Anthology.

== Music and lyrics ==
"Move Over Ms. L" is an up-tempo rock 'n' roll song with a "driving rhythm." Fab Four FAQ author Robert Rodriguez feels that stylistically the song fits well better with the rock 'n' roll oldies such as "Stand by Me" from Lennon's Rock 'n' Roll than with the songs on Walls and Bridges. Beatle historian Bruce Spizer describes the backing music as being similar to that on Larry Williams' "Bony Moronie", which Lennon included on Rock 'n' Roll.

Some of the lyrics to "Move Over Ms. L" have been interpreted as mocking Lennon's wife Yoko Ono, from whom Lennon was separated when the song was written. In particular, the chorus of "Move Over Ms. L / You know I wish you well" appears to be directed at Ono. Other lyrics include Lennon playing with words and incorporating cliches in ways that don't always seem logical, but which Lennon may have put together that way just because he felt they sounded good. Rodriguez describes it as a "stream-of-consciousness rocker." Lennon would reuse the lyrics of one of those cliches, "They're starving back in China," in his later song "Nobody Told Me".

== John Lennon's versions ==
Music lecturers Ben Urish and Keith Bielen describe Lennon's vocal as a "full-throttle vocal performance." Besides singing the lyrics, Lennon exhorts the musicians with phrases like "whoo-oo-hoo," "alright!" and "that's right" during the song. Instrumentation includes Lennon and Jesse Ed Davis on electric guitar, Eddie Mottau on acoustic guitar, Ken Ascher on piano, Klaus Voormann on bass, Arthur Jenkins on percussion, Jim Keltner on drums and various horn instruments.

An alternative version of the song was released on John Lennon Anthology, which excludes the horns and overdubs, and with slightly different lyrics. Spizer describes this version as having a western swing feel. Urish and Bielen describe this version as "looser" than the original, but state that Lennon's exuberance remains intact.

== Keith Moon's version ==
Keith Moon released his version of “Move Over Ms. L" on his 1975 album Two Sides of the Moon and later as the B-side of his "Solid Gold" single. Moon uses an arrangement very similar to Lennon's but with different horn riffs. Beatle biographer John Blaney speculates that Lennon may have sent Moon a rough mix of his version of the track, rather than a mere demo. Urish and Bielen claim that the recording "makes the most musically of Moon's limited vocal abilities." On the other hand, Rodriguez describes Moon's vocal performance as "cringing" and the overall performance as a disorganized mess, with many Los Angeles–based musicians participating in the recording amidst lots of partying with drugs and alcohol. Beatle historians Chip Madinger and Mark Easter regard Moon's version as "lamentable."
