= List of posthumous number ones on the UK singles chart =

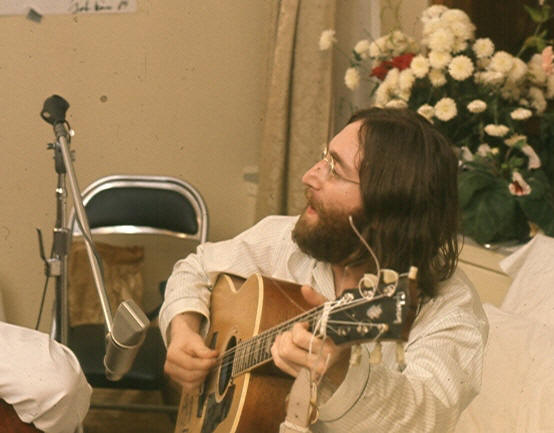
John Lennon achieved three number ones within two months of his murder in December 1980.

The death of a musician, or the use of a dead musician's work in advertising, may cause a sharp increase in sales of the musician's recordings and associated products; this has led to a number of posthumous number one singles in the UK and elsewhere. The phenomenon, a topic of discussion in both the media and academia, has occurred 20 times in the UK since 1959.

The UK Singles Chart is a record chart compiled on behalf of the British record industry based on sales of singles in the UK. Since 1997, the chart has been compiled by The Official Charts Company and was based entirely on sales of physical singles from retail outlets until 2006, when digital downloads were included in the chart compilation. Streaming was added to the methodology in 2014. The UK Singles Chart originated in 1952, when New Musical Express (NME) published the first chart of singles sales. The first deceased artist to top the charts was Buddy Holly, who died in a plane crash on 3 February 1959. Three weeks later his song "It Doesn't Matter Anymore" entered the charts, and in April it reached number one. In the 1960s Eddie Cochran and Jim Reeves achieved their first and only UK number ones after their deaths, as did Jimi Hendrix in 1970.

In August 1977 the "King of Rock'n Roll", Elvis Presley, died of a heart attack and his song "Way Down", which was already in the charts at the time, quickly climbed to number one. Presley achieved four further posthumous number ones in the 2000s. In 2002 his song "A Little Less Conversation", a little-known former B-side, topped the charts after being remixed by Dutch dance music producer Junkie XL for a television advertisement for Nike, which broke Presley's long-standing tie with The Beatles for the most UK number ones. Three years later three of his singles returned to the top spot when all his previous number one singles were re-issued to mark what would have been his 70th birthday.

In late 1980 and early 1981 three singles by John Lennon reached number one in quick succession following his murder on 8 December 1980. His fellow former member of The Beatles, George Harrison, achieved a posthumous number one in 2002 when a re-issue of his song "My Sweet Lord", originally a number one in 1971, entered the chart at number one. In doing so, he knocked "More than a Woman" by American singer Aaliyah from the top spot, the first time that two deceased artists had topped the charts in consecutive weeks.

== Number ones ==
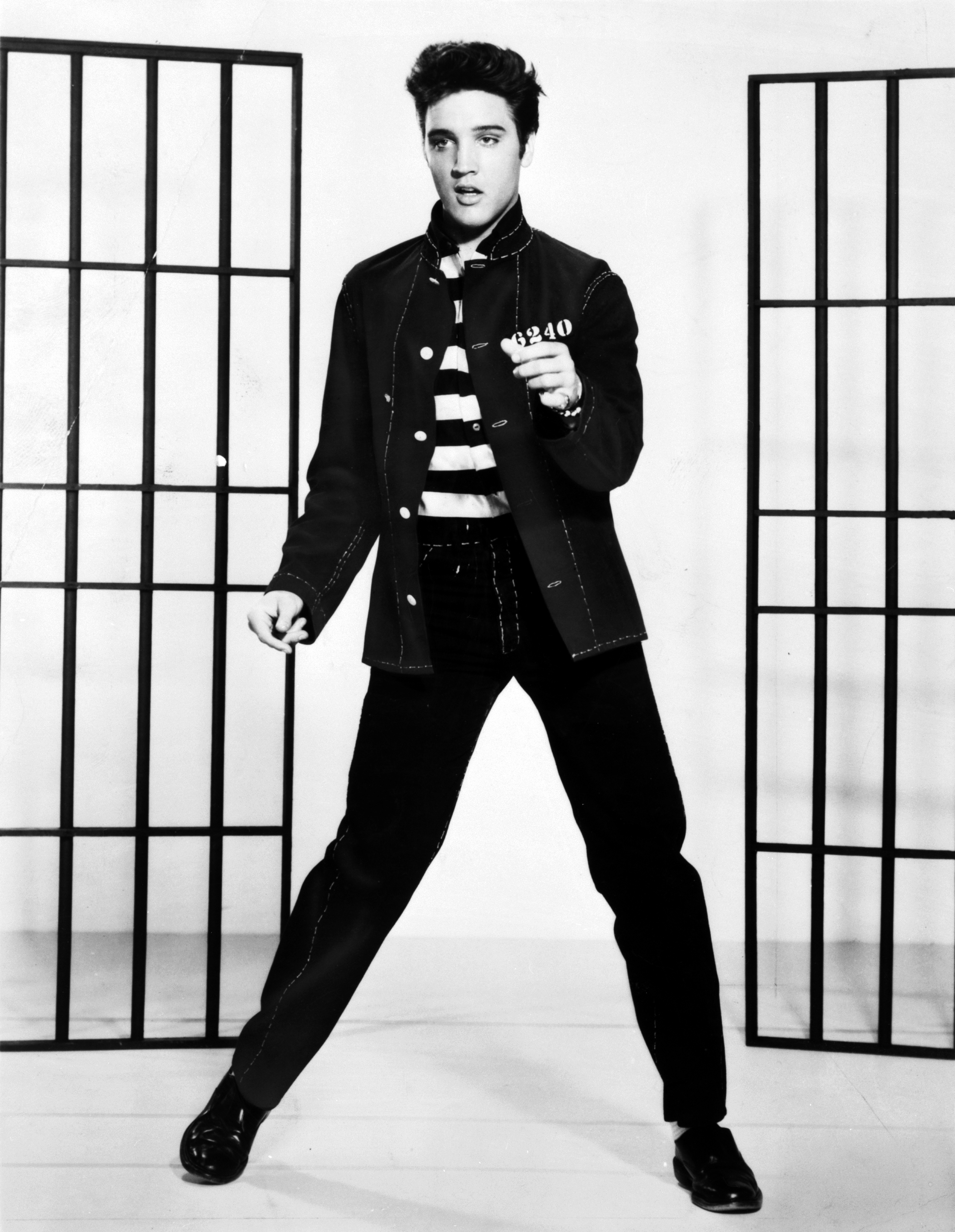
Elvis Presley has achieved five posthumous number-one hits, one shortly after his death in 1977 and four in the 2000s with re-releases of older songs.

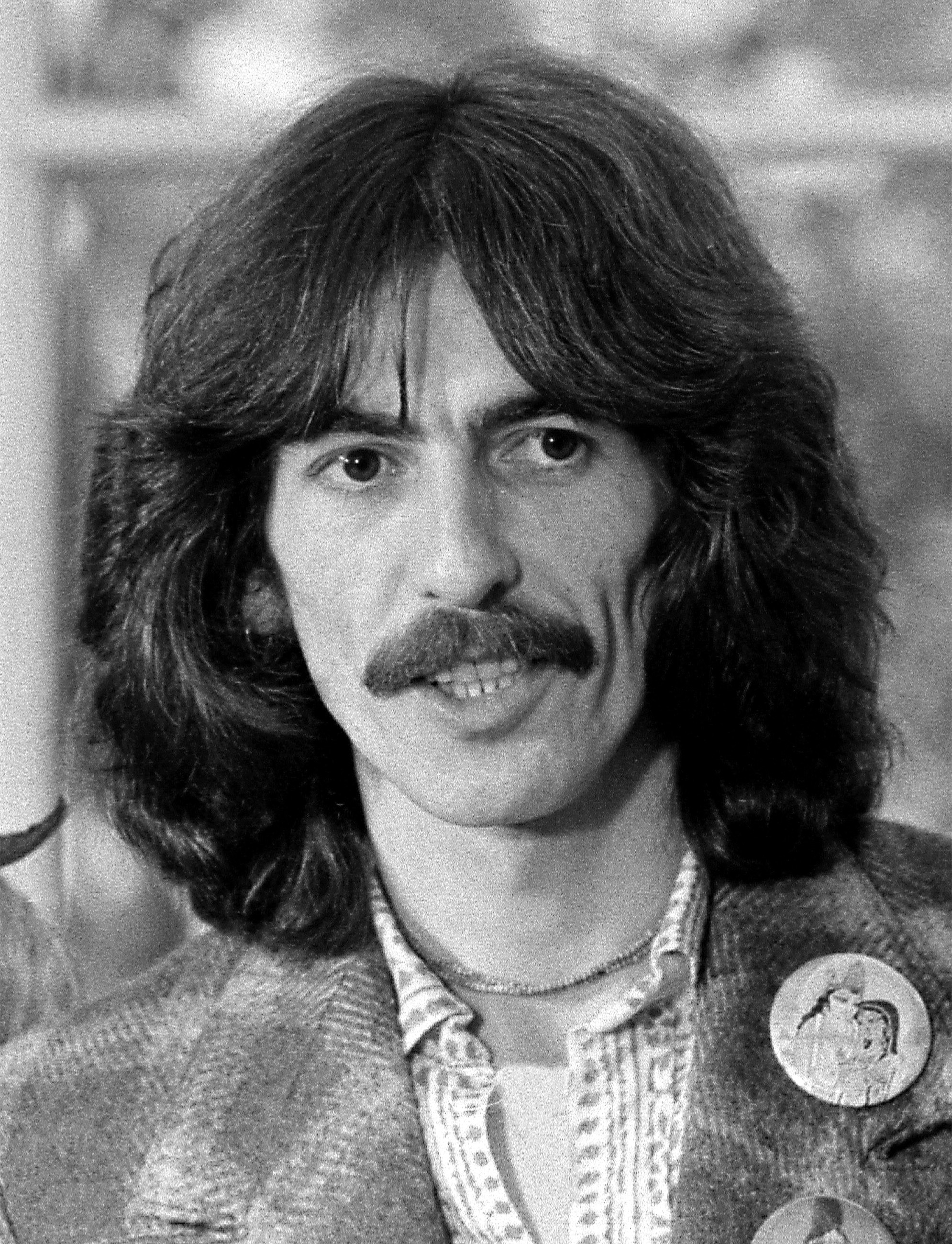
In 2002 George Harrison knocked Aaliyah off the top spot, the first time that one deceased artist had replaced another at number one.

The following singles were all explicitly credited (either wholly or partially) to deceased artists when they reached number one on the UK Singles Chart. Singles featuring deceased artists who did not receive an explicit credit (e.g. as a member of a band), such as the 1991 re-release of Queen's "Bohemian Rhapsody" following the death of lead singer Freddie Mercury and the 2021 chart performance of Wham!'s "Last Christmas" just over four years after George Michael's death, are not included.

Artist	Single	Date of death	Reached number one (week ending) (Note: This date represents the "week ending" date listed on the chart in question.)	Weeks at number one	Ref.
Buddy Holly	"It Doesn't Matter Anymore"	3 February 1959	25 April 1959	3	
Eddie Cochran	"Three Steps to Heaven"	17 April 1960	25 June 1960	2	
Jim Reeves	"Distant Drums"	31 July 1964	24 September 1966	5	
Jimi Hendrix	"Voodoo Chile" (Note: Credited to The Jimi Hendrix Experience)	18 September 1970	21 November 1970	1	
Elvis Presley	"Way Down"	16 August 1977	3 September 1977	5	
John Lennon	"(Just Like) Starting Over"	8 December 1980	20 December 1980	1	
John Lennon	"Imagine"	8 December 1980	10 January 1981	4	
John Lennon	"Woman"	8 December 1980	7 February 1981	2	
Jackie Wilson	"Reet Petite"	21 January 1984	27 December 1986	4	
Freddie Mercury	"Living on My Own"	24 November 1991	14 August 1993	2	
Aaliyah	"More Than a Woman"	25 August 2001	19 January 2002	1	
George Harrison	"My Sweet Lord"	29 November 2001	26 January 2002	1	
Elvis Presley	"A Little Less Conversation" (Note: Credited to Elvis vs JXL)	16 August 1977	22 June 2002	4	
Elvis Presley	"Jailhouse Rock"	16 August 1977	9 January 2005	1	
Elvis Presley	"One Night" / "I Got Stung"	16 August 1977	16 January 2005	1	
Elvis Presley	"It's Now or Never"	16 August 1977	30 January 2005	1	
2Pac	"Ghetto Gospel" (Note: Credited to 2Pac featuring Elton John)	13 September 1996	2 July 2005	3	
The Notorious B.I.G.	"Nasty Girl" (Note: Credited to The Notorious B.I.G. featuring Diddy, Nelly, Jagged Edge and Avery Storm)	9 March 1997	4 February 2006	2	
Eva Cassidy	"What a Wonderful World" (Note: Duet with Katie Melua)	2 November 1996	22 December 2007	1	
Juice Wrld	"Godzilla" (Note: Credited to Eminem featuring Juice Wrld)	8 December 2019	30 January 2020	1	

== See also ==
- List of posthumous number ones on the UK Albums Chart
