= Double Fantasy =

Studio album by John Lennon and Yoko Ono
- Released: 17 November 1980
- Recorded: 7 August – 19 October 1980
- Studios: The Hit Factory, New York City
- Genres: Rock; new wave
- Length: 45:01
- Labels: Geffen; Warner Bros.
- Producers: John Lennon; Yoko Ono; Jack Douglas

John Lennon chronology
Shaved Fish (1975)	Double Fantasy (1980)	The John Lennon Collection (1982)

Yoko Ono chronology
Feeling the Space (1973)	Double Fantasy (1980)	Season of Glass (1981)

Singles from Double Fantasy
- 1. "(Just Like) Starting Over" Released: 23 October 1980; 2. "Woman" Released: 12 January 1981; 3. "Watching the Wheels" Released: 13 March 1981

Double Fantasy Stripped Down
- Cover of the 2010 remix with stripped down production.

Double Fantasy is the fifth collaborative studio album by John Lennon and Yoko Ono, the seventh studio album released by John Lennon under his own name, and the final one before Lennon's death. Released in November 1980 on Geffen Records, the album marked Lennon's short-lived return to recording music full-time, following his five-year hiatus to raise his son Sean. Recording sessions took place at the Hit Factory in New York City between August and October 1980. The final album features songs from both Lennon and Ono, largely alternating between the two in its track listing. Other tracks recorded by Lennon from the sessions were compiled by Ono for release on Milk and Honey in 1984.

Upon its release, the album stumbled on music charts and received widespread negative reviews from music critics, with many focusing on the album's idealisation of Lennon and Ono's marriage. However, following Lennon's murder three weeks after its release, it became a worldwide commercial success and went on to win the 1981 Grammy Award for Album of the Year. In subsequent decades, the album has been viewed favourably, with Lennon's songs in particular garnering praise as some of his finest.

In 2010, Ono worked with Jack Douglas, the original producer, to release a remix of the album titled Double Fantasy Stripped Down, which featured less lavish production than the original.

== Background ==
Following the birth of his son, Sean, in 1975, Lennon put his musical career on hold to raise him. After five years of little musical activity, aside from recording the occasional demo in his apartment in New York, Lennon resumed his career.

In June 1980, Lennon embarked on a sailing trip from Newport, Rhode Island to Bermuda. During the journey, the 43-foot schooner named Megan Jaye encountered a severe storm. One by one, the crew of five were overcome with fatigue and seasickness save for Lennon, who was eventually forced to take the helm alone for six hours. It had the effect of both renewing his confidence and making him contemplate the fragility of life. As a result, he began to write new songs and reworked earlier demos. He commented later, "I was so centred after the experience at sea that I was tuned in to the cosmos – and all these songs came!" Ono also wrote many songs, inspired with new confidence after Lennon had stated that he believed that contemporary popular music, such as "Rock Lobster" by the B-52's, bore similarities to Ono's earlier work.

The couple decided to release their work on the same album, the first time they had done so since 1972's politically charged Some Time in New York City. In stark contrast to that album, Double Fantasy (subtitled A Heart Play) was a collection of songs wherein husband and wife would conduct a musical dialogue. The album took its title from a species of freesia, seen in the Bermuda Botanical Gardens, whose name Lennon regarded as a perfect description of his marriage to Ono.

Lennon was also inspired to return to music by his former songwriting partner within the Beatles. Upon hearing former bandmate Paul McCartney's 1980 single "Coming Up", Lennon deemed the song "a good piece of work." According to McCartney, the track prompted Lennon to return to recording later that year.

== Recording ==
Ono approached producer Jack Douglas, with whom the couple had previously worked, and gave him Lennon's demos to listen to. "My immediate impressions were that I was going to have a hard time making it better than the demos because there was such intimacy in the demos," Douglas told Uncut's Chris Hunt in 2005.

Sessions for the album began at the Hit Factory in New York City on 7 August 1980 and continued until 19 October 1980. Lennon and Ono were rarely in the studio at the same time, primarily because Ono did not want Lennon imposing himself in her work. They produced dozens of songs, enough to fill Double Fantasy and a large part of a projected second album, Milk and Honey.

Lennon wanted to work with different musicians than he had previously, and had Douglas assemble and rehearse the band without telling them who they would be recording with. While the sessions were underway, Douglas brought Rick Nielsen and Bun E. Carlos of the band Cheap Trick (whom he was also producing) to play on Lennon's "I'm Losing You" and Ono's "I'm Moving On", but these were eventually re-recorded with the studio musicians. The Cheap Trick version of "I'm Losing You" was included on the John Lennon Anthology collection released in 1998.

The sessions remained top secret. According to Douglas, this was because Lennon was not confident in his work, feeling that he was out of touch with the contemporary music scene and could no longer write or sing up to the standard he set in his heyday, and wanted to be able to discreetly abort the sessions if he felt they were not turning out well; at one point he spoke of giving most of the songs he wrote for the album to his ex-bandmate Ringo Starr. Lennon and Ono still were not signed to a record label and paid for the initial sessions themselves. After they were satisfied with the album, their publicist Bruce Replogle leaked the news that the couple were back in the studio again.

Immediately, Lennon was inundated with offers from all the major labels. The recording industry was shocked when the couple signed with the newly formed Geffen Records on 22 September 1980 because David Geffen shrewdly insisted on speaking with Ono first and regarded her contributions as equal to Lennon's. He signed them before hearing any of the tracks.

== Release, reception and aftermath ==
The album was preceded by the single "(Just Like) Starting Over", which was backed with Ono's "Kiss Kiss Kiss". It was released on 20 October 1980 in the United States, and four days later in the United Kingdom. Originally peaking at number 8 in the UK chart, after Lennon's murder the single reached number one. It was overtaken to the Christmas Number One Single rank by the St Winifred's School Choir's "There's No One Quite Like Grandma," finishing at number 2 on that list. After two weeks at number one, a previous Lennon song, "Imagine", replaced it. In the US, the single was inching upward in the top 10 before reaching number one following Lennon's death.

The album was released on 17 November 1980 in both the UK and US. Geffen had planned an elaborate cover for Lennon's comeback, but Ono could not decide on a photo. Not wanting to miss the Christmas release deadline, Geffen used the single sleeve as the front cover, while choosing an outtake from the same photo session for the back. The tracks were sequenced as a dialogue between Lennon and Ono; one of his songs followed by one of hers. On the initial pressings, the track listing was out of sequence on the album cover. Initial sales were sluggish. In the UK albums chart, it had peaked at number 14 then slipped to number 46, while in the US, it had risen to number 11. Upon Lennon's murder, the album jumped to number 1 in the US Billboard chart, where it stayed for eight weeks, and in the UK, it jumped to number 2, where it remained for seven weeks before finally spending two weeks at number 1.

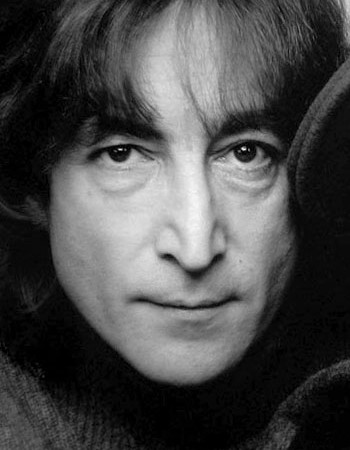
John Lennon in 1980.

"Woman", chosen by Lennon, was released as a posthumous single, backed with Ono's "Beautiful Boys". It was released on 12 January 1981 in the US and 16 January in the UK, reaching number 1 in the UK and in the US on the Cash Box singles chart, while peaking at number 2 for three weeks on the Billboard Hot 100. Released as the final single from the album, "Watching the Wheels", backed with Ono's "Yes, I'm Your Angel", peaked at number 10 and 30 in the US and UK charts respectively. The single was released in the US on 13 March 1981, and on 27 March 1981 in the UK.

Lennon's Bermuda trip and Double Fantasy inspired the 2013 tribute CD and book Lennon Bermuda.

=== Critical reception ===
Professional ratings
Review scores
Source	Rating
AllMusic	4/5 stars
Christgau's Record Guide	A
The Encyclopedia of Popular Music	3/5 stars
Mojo	3/5 stars
MusicHound	3.5/5 stars
Paste	3/5 stars
Q	3/5 stars
Record Mirror	3/5 stars
Rolling Stone (2010)	5/5 stars
(The New) Rolling Stone Album Guide	4/5 stars
Slant Magazine	3.5/5 stars
Smash Hits	1.5/5 stars

Initial critical reaction to the album was largely negative. The negative reviews focused on the album's idealisation of Lennon and Ono's marriage. Kit Rachlis of the Boston Phoenix admitted to being "annoyed" by Lennon and Ono's assumption "that lots of people care deeply" about them. Charles Shaar Murray, of NME, wrote that the couple's domestic bliss "sounds like a great life but unfortunately it makes a lousy record," adding that he wished Lennon had "kept his big happy trap shut until he has something to say that was even vaguely relevant to those of us not married to Yoko Ono." Record Mirror gave the album a largely negative review, highlighting "Watching the Wheels" as the best track, but saying "(Just Like) Starting Over", "Woman" and "Dear Yoko" were "re-treading old ground", the latter two being "nothing more than Imagine out-takes nine years on". Smash Hits said the album was "dismal" and although Ono showed some spirit, "Lennon sleepwalks through the project like a man who's forgotten what music used to mean to him."

Three weeks after the album's release, Lennon was murdered and several negative reviews by prominent critics were withheld from publication, including those by Stephen Holden of The New York Times, Tom Carson of Rolling Stone, and Geoffrey Stokes of The Village Voice (Stokes had found the concept and theme to be "basically misogynist").

Double Fantasy finished 37th in The Village Voice's 1980 Pazz & Jop, an annual poll of prominent music critics. Robert Christgau, the poll's creator, ranked it 7th on his own list of the year's best albums. Although he was put off by its simplistic lyrics and music upon first listen, Christgau said the music works a "minor miracle" with "rich, precise" song form and a "command of readymades" to put "the anonymous usages of studio rock to striking artistic purpose". He felt that the use of alternating Ono's improved vocals with Lennon's "makes the union come alive" better than his outspoken, straightforward lyrics and concluded that the album is not great but "memorable and gratifying" as rare, "connubial rock and roll". In his retrospective review for AllMusic, Stephen Thomas Erlewine comments: "these are really nice tunes and what's special about them is their niceness – it's a sweet acceptance of middle age, which, of course, makes [Lennon's] assassination all the sadder."

In 1982, Douglas, Lennon and Ono won the 1981 Grammy Award for Album of the Year for Double Fantasy at the 24th Annual Grammy Awards. In 1989, the album was ranked number 29 on Rolling Stone magazine's list of the 100 greatest albums of the 1980s.

In 2020, Rolling Stone included Double Fantasy in their "80 Greatest albums of 1980" list, praising Lennon and Ono for their collaboration as "each song acts as a dialogue between the couple."

=== Lawsuit ===
In 1984, Douglas filed a lawsuit against Ono over unpaid royalties for his work on Double Fantasy and Milk and Honey. Douglas recounted in a 1999 interview, "I waited like three years, then I finally said to Yoko, 'It's really a lot of royalties probably accruing here ... You don't have to deal with it, let's just sort it out, let our people sort it out.' And I got like a nasty letter, almost like, 'Fuck you, you're not getting anything.'" A jury ruled that Ono had wrongfully withheld royalty payments from Douglas and that he was entitled to $2.5 million from revenues for Double Fantasy and an undetermined share of revenues from Milk and Honey.

=== Reissues ===
"Beautiful Boy (Darling Boy)" was re-released as the B-side to a reissue of "Happy Xmas (War Is Over)" to promote The John Lennon Collection in November 1982. It was first released on CD on 13 October 1986 in the UK, and nearly a year later on 15 September 1987 in the US. The album was re-released on cassette, CD and vinyl in 1989, after EMI had obtained the rights to the album. On 9 October 2000, EMI/Capitol released a remastered version of the album, containing three bonus tracks. (Note: The bonus tracks are: "Help Me to Help Myself", "Walking on Thin Ice" and "Central Park Stroll".)

In 2010, Ono and Douglas supervised the release of a remix of the album called Double Fantasy Stripped Down. Released as a two-disc set, it included a newly remastered copy of the original album along with an alternative version of the album featuring simpler arrangements without the original's lavish production, with cover artwork by Sean Lennon. Ono said of the remix: "This new version really allows us to focus our attention on John's amazing vocals. Technology has advanced so much that, conversely, I wanted to use new techniques to really frame these amazing songs and John’s voice as simply as possible. By stripping down some of the instrumentation, the power of the songs shines through with an enhanced clarity." Stephen Thomas Erlewine of AllMusic gave the remix a negative review, commenting that because Double Fantasy was envisioned from the beginning as a polished studio production, the remix feels like after-the-fact tinkering with an album that had already been presented in its best possible form. He also found the changes for the most part inconsequential, with little effect on the overall impact.

== Track listing ==
Side one
No.	Title	Writer(s)	Length
1.	"(Just Like) Starting Over"	John Lennon	3:56
2.	"Kiss Kiss Kiss"	Yoko Ono	2:42
3.	"Cleanup Time"	Lennon	2:58
4.	"Give Me Something"	Ono	1:35
5.	"I'm Losing You"	Lennon	3:57
6.	"I'm Moving On"	Ono	2:20
7.	"Beautiful Boy (Darling Boy)"	Lennon	4:02

Side two
No.	Title	Writer(s)	Length
1.	"Watching the Wheels"	Lennon	4:00
2.	"Yes, I'm Your Angel^{[A]}"	Ono	3:08
3.	"Woman"	Lennon	3:32
4.	"Beautiful Boys"	Ono	2:55
5.	"Dear Yoko"	Lennon	2:34
6.	"Every Man Has a Woman Who Loves Him"	Ono	4:02
7.	"Hard Times Are Over"	Ono	3:20

Bonus tracks

2000 reissue bonus tracks
No.	Title	Writer(s)	Length
15.	"Help Me to Help Myself"	Lennon	2:37
16.	"Walking on Thin Ice"	Ono	6:00
17.	"Central Park Stroll" (dialogue)		0:17

=== 2010 mixes ===
Stripped Down
No.	Title	Writer(s)	Length
1.	"(Just Like) Starting Over"	Lennon	4:24
2.	"Kiss Kiss Kiss"	Ono	2:45
3.	"Cleanup Time"	Lennon	3:56
4.	"Give Me Something"	Ono	1:31
5.	"I'm Losing You"	Lennon	4:26
6.	"I'm Moving On"	Ono	2:28
7.	"Beautiful Boy (Darling Boy)"	Lennon	3:50
8.	"Watching the Wheels"	Lennon	3:32
9.	"Yes, I'm Your Angel"	Ono	2:53
10.	"Woman"	Lennon	3:45
11.	"Beautiful Boys"	Ono	3:16
12.	"Dear Yoko"	Lennon	3:03
13.	"Every Man Has a Woman Who Loves Him"	Ono	4:46
14.	"Hard Times Are Over"	Ono	3:38

- A On initial pressings of the album, "Yes, I'm Your Angel" was simply titled "I'm Your Angel". It was re-titled when it was released as the B-side to "Watching the Wheels", and all reissues and remasters of Double Fantasy list the track as "Yes, I'm Your Angel".

== Accolades ==
=== Grammy Awards ===
Year	Nominee / work	Award	Result
1981	Double Fantasy	Album of the Year	Won
1981	Double Fantasy	Best Pop Vocal Performance – Male	Nominated
1981	"(Just Like) Starting Over"	Record of the Year	Nominated

== Personnel ==
Credits per the album's sleeve notes.

Musicians

- John Lennon – lead vocals, guitar
- Yoko Ono – lead vocals
- Earl Slick – guitar
- Hugh McCracken – guitar
- Tony Levin – bass guitar
- George Small – keyboards
- Andy Newmark – drums
- Arthur Jenkins, Jr. – percussion
- Ed Walsh – Oberheim synthesiser
- Randy Stein – English concertina
- Robert Greenidge – steel drum on "Beautiful Boy"
- Matthew Cunningham – hammer dulcimer on "Watching the Wheels"
- Howard Johnson, Grant Hungerford, John Parran, Seldon Powell, George "Young" Opalisky, Roger Rosenberg, David Tofani, Ronald Tooley – horns
- Cas Mijac (Michelle Simpson, Cassandra Wooten, Cheryl Mason Jacks) – background vocals
- Eric Troyer – background vocals
- Benny Cummings Singers – background vocals
- The Kings Temple Choir – background vocals

Technical

- Jack Douglas, John Lennon, Yoko Ono – producers
- Tony Davilio – horn arrangement on "I'm Your Angel", musical associate
- Toshihiro Hamaya, Frederic Seaman – production assistants
- Lee DeCarlo – engineer
- Jon Smith, James Ball, Julie Last – assistant engineers
- George Marino – mastering
- Kishin Shinoyama – photography
- Christopher Whorf – artwork

== Charts ==
=== Weekly charts ===
Chart (1980–1981)	Position
Australia (Kent Music Report)	1
Austrian Albums	1
Canadian Albums (RPM)	1
Dutch Mega Albums (MegaCharts)	4
French Albums (SNEP)	2
Finnish Albums (Official Finnish Charts)	7
Italian Albums (FIMI)	6
Japanese Oricon LP Chart	1
New Zealand Albums (RIANZ)	1
Norwegian Albums (VG-lista)	1
Swedish Albums (Sverigetopplistan)	1
UK Albums	1
US Billboard 200	1
West German Albums (Media Control)	2

=== Year-end charts ===
Chart (1980)	Position
French Albums	16
UK Albums	12
Chart (1981)	Position
Australian Albums	1
Austrian Albums	2
Canadian Albums (RPM)	3
Japanese Albums (Oricon)	29
UK Albums	10
US Billboard 200	2
West German Albums (Media Control)	3

== Certifications and sales ==
Region	Certification	Certified units/sales
Australia	—	285,000
France (SNEP)	Platinum	300,000^{*}
Germany (BVMI)	Gold	250,000^{^}
Hong Kong (IFPI Hong Kong)	Platinum	20,000^{*}
Israel	Gold	20,000
Japan (Oricon Charts)	—	306,470
New Zealand (RMNZ)	Platinum	15,000^{^}
Spain (Promusicae)	Gold	50,000^{^}
United Kingdom (BPI)	Platinum	300,000^{^}
United States (RIAA)	3× Platinum	3,000,000^{^}
^{*} Sales figures based on certification alone.^{^} Shipments figures based on certification alone.
