= Yes, I'm Your Angel =

Yoko Ono song

Single by Yoko Ono

from the album Double Fantasy
- A-side: "Watching the Wheels"
- Released: 13 March 1981 (US); 27 March 1981 (UK)
- Recorded: 1980
- Genre: Rock
- Length: 2:50
- Label: Geffen
- Songwriter: Yoko Ono
- Producers: John Lennon, Yoko Ono, Jack Douglas

Yoko Ono singles chronology
"Walking on Thin Ice" (1981)	"Yes, I'm Your Angel" (1981)	"No, No, No" (1981)

"Yes, I'm Your Angel", also known as "I'm Your Angel", is a song written by Yoko Ono that was first released on Ono's and John Lennon's 1980 album Double Fantasy. It was later released as the B-side of Lennon's single "Watching the Wheels". The initial release of Double Fantasy used the title "I'm Your Angel" but later releases as well as the single used the title "Yes, I'm Your Angel".

== Music and lyrics ==
"Yes, I'm Your Angel" has a sound similar to that of 1930s and 1940s big band songs. In particular, the first three bars have an almost identical melody and harmony as Eddie Cantor's 1928 hit "Makin' Whoopee", written by Gus Kahn and Walter Donaldson. Although the two songs also have similar harmonic structures, the songs' melodies diverge by the fourth bar and "Yes, I'm Your Angel" has a completely different bridge than "Makin' Whoopee". Nonetheless, the similarities between the two songs prompted the publishers of "Makin' Whoopee" to sue Ono, requesting $1 million in monetary damages, a prohibition on any marketing of "Yes, I'm Your Angel", and that all records, tapes and sheet music of "Yes, I'm Your Angel" be destroyed. The suit was settled with Ono paying undisclosed monetary damages, but without restrictions on future releases on subsequent sales of Double Fantasy.

Ono sings in a Marilyn Monroe-like voice. Winona Daily News critic Mike Killeen states that she sounds like a "vaudeville crooner". Instrumentation for "Yes, I'm Your Angel" includes a clarinet and horns. Tony Davillo, who did the horn arrangements, claims that although he created horn arrangements for several Double Fantasy songs, including "(Just Like) Starting Over", "Cleanup Time" and "I'm Losing You", the arrangement for this song was the only one that was used. George Small, who played piano on the song, said he played using a stride technique. Lennon does some whistling on the song, which music lecturers Ben Urish and Ken Bielen state adds "an informal carefree touch to the bandstand arrangement and vocal styling".

Rhymes such as "I'm in your pocket, you're in my locket" are also reminiscent of 1930s and 1940s songs. Courier-Journal critic Marc Zakem calls the lyrics "purposely silly" but notes the humor of the song, including the use of a wolf whistle in the background when Ono sings "I'm so pretty."

"Yes, I'm Your Angel" follows "Watching the Wheels" on the Double Fantasy album, and is introduced by some spoken conversation, the sounds of a horse-drawn carriage and a door slamming, and some piano and violin phrases. Lennon said of this introduction:

One of the voices is me going "God bless you man, thank you, man, cross my palm with silver, you've got a lucky face," which is what the English guys who beg or want a tip say, and that's what you hear me mumbling. And then we re-created the sounds of what Yoko and I call the Strawberries and Violin Room—the Palm Court at the Plaza Hotel. We like to sit there occasionally and listen to the old violin and have a cup of tea and some strawberries. It's romantic. And so the picture is: There's this kind of street prophet, Hyde Park corner-type guy who just watches the wheels going around. And people are throwing money in the hat—we faked that in the studio, we had friends of ours walking up and down throwing coins in a hat—and he's saying, Thank you thank you, and then you get in the horse carriage and you go around New York and go into the hotel and the violins are playing and then this woman comes on and sings about being an angel.

The version of "Yes, I'm Your Angel" that was released as a single edits out this introduction. The version released on Onobox edits out part of the introduction.

== Reception ==
Music critic Johnny Rogan calls the song "anti-climatic", particularly criticizing Ono using her baby voice to sing it. Beatle biographer John Blaney called it a joke and pastiche on 1930s show tunes, but stated that it "must have sent all but the most hardened [Ono] fans reaching for the fast-forward button". Small called "Yes, I'm Your Angel" a "really cute song", stating that it showed off Ono's humorous side, which surprises people who think she is always dark and serious. Hartford Courant writer Henry McNulty states that the song was intended as a birthday song and states that Yoko "delicately trills" her vocals, with the gentleness and restraint of her vocals being surprising to those only familiar with her "banshee wails". Ultimate Classic Rock critic Michael Gallucci rated it as Ono's 10th best song, describing it as "old-timey and playful" and saying that it "balances nostalgic music-hall camp with genuine sentiment".
