= Kiss Kiss Kiss (Yoko Ono song) =

1980 single

Single by Yoko Ono

from the album Double Fantasy
- A-side: "(Just Like) Starting Over"
- Released: 24 October 1980
- Genre: Rock; avant-garde; new wave
- Length: 2:42
- Label: Geffen
- Songwriter: Yoko Ono
- Producers: John Lennon, Yoko Ono, Jack Douglas

Yoko Ono singles chronology
"Yume O Motou (Let's Have a Dream)" (1974)	"Kiss Kiss Kiss" (1980)	"Beautiful Boys" (1981)

"Kiss Kiss Kiss"

Single by Yoko Ono
- Released: 2002
- Genre: Rock, dance
- Length: 2:41
- Label: Parlophone Records (original Geffen)
- Songwriter: Yoko Ono
- Producers: Yoko Ono, John Lennon and Jack Douglas

Yoko Ono singles chronology
"Open Your Box" (2001)	"Kiss Kiss Kiss" (2002)	"Yang Yang" (2002)

"Kiss Kiss Kiss"

Single by Yoko Ono and Peaches
- Released: 2007
- Genre: Rock, dance
- Length: 3:18
- Label: Parlophone Records
- Songwriter: Yoko Ono
- Producer: Peaches

Yoko Ono singles chronology
"Open Your Box" (2001)	"Kiss Kiss Kiss" (2007)	"Yang Yang" (2002)

Peaches singles chronology
"Boys Wanna Be Her" (2006)	"Kiss Kiss Kiss" (2007)	"Wild Thing Peaches Remix" (2007)

"Kiss Kiss Kiss" is a song by Japanese singer Yoko Ono. It was originally released on Double Fantasy, her joint album with John Lennon, as well as on the B-side of his "(Just Like) Starting Over" single. The disco and new wave-influenced song features Ono gasping heavily and appearing to reach orgasm.

In 2002, following the success of "Open Your Box", the track was remixed by Superchumbo and released as a single. It reached #20 on the US dance charts.

In 2005, Detroit group The Dirtbombs included their cover of "Kiss, Kiss, Kiss" on their album If You Don't Already Have a Look. Most recently, the track was remixed by Peaches for the Yes, I'm a Witch album.

== Composition ==
According to Beatle biographer John Blaney, "Kiss Kiss Kiss" combines elements of adult-oriented rock with avant-garde. According to music lecturers Ben Urish and Ken Bielen, the song has punk rock elements along with martial drum rolls. Blaney regards it as being "more musically and lyrically adventurous" than "(Just Like) Starting Over."

Urish and Bielen describe the lyrics as having "an erotic tone," pointing explicitly to a line that includes the phrases "touch me" and "shaking inside." In the second half of the song, Ono's provides a spoken word voice-over that leads to the orgasmic climax by repeating the words "faster" and "harder" in Japanese, interspersed with groans and cries that Ono biographer Jerry Hopkins describes as "blatantly sexual." As she does this, Urish and Bielen describe Lennon's "screeching" guitar playing as "[urging] her on."

In Lennon and Ono's joint 1980 interview with Playboy, Ono said:

John is saying in his song [Starting Over], OK, we had the energy in the Sixties, in the Seventies we separated, but let's start over in the Eighties. He's reaching out to me, the woman. Reaching out after all that's happened, over the battlefield of dead families, is more difficult this time around. On the other side of the record is my song, "Kiss Kiss Kiss," which is the other side of the same question. There is the sound of a woman coming to a climax on it, and she is crying out to be held, to be touched. It will be controversial, because people still feel it's less natural to hear the sounds of a woman's lovemaking than, say, the sound of a Concorde, killing the atmosphere and polluting nature. Altogether, both sides are a prayer to change the Eighties.

Although Ono described the song as being about liberation and being courageous enough to show vulnerability, she felt embarrassed when she tried recording the simulated orgasm vocals in front of the male recording engineers. She stated that "I started to do it and then I suddenly looked and all those engineers were all looking, and I thought, I can't do that, you know? So I said, well, turn off all the lights and put a screen around me, and I did it that way."

Music critic Johnny Rogan stated that the song "offered proof of Yoko's commercial and contemporary sound, with Andy Newmark's drums prominent in the mix and the vocal surprisingly pleasant and in tune. Iowa City Press-Citizen critic Curt Seifert described "Kiss Kiss Kiss" as a "rather disposable [example] of the fatuity of [Ono's] past experimentations with so-called "avant garde" music. Atlanta Constitution critic Bill King regarded "Kiss Kiss Kiss" as the best of Ono's songs on Double Fantasy. Miami Herald critic Bill Ashton described the song as "a sort of rock dance number that sounds a lot like the warblings of Lene Lovich." In 2013 Ultimate Classic Rock critic Michael Gallucci rated it as Ono's 2nd best song of all time.

== Recording ==
"Kiss Kiss Kiss" was first recorded at The Hit Factory in New York City on 8 August 1980. Ono was dissatisfied with the performance and the song was re-recorded on 26 August 1980.

== Track listing ==
1. "Kiss Kiss Kiss" (Superchumbo's Twisted Kiss)
2. "Kiss Kiss Kiss" (Superchumbo's Twisted Touch)
3. "Kiss Kiss Kiss" (Superchumbo's Single Edit)

== Official versions ==
1. "Kiss Kiss Kiss" (Album Version) - 2:41
2. "Kiss Kiss Kiss" (Stripped Down Version) - 2:45 (from Double Fantasy - Stripped Down)
3. "Kiss Kiss Kiss" (Superchumbo's Single Edit) - 3:48 (later included on Open Your Box)
4. "Kiss Kiss Kiss" (Superchumbo's Twisted Kiss) - 7:03
5. "Kiss Kiss Kiss" (Superchumbo's Twisted Touch) - 8:31
6. "Kiss Kiss Kiss" (featuring Peaches) - 3:18 (from Yes I'm a Witch)

== Personnel ==
- Yoko Ono – vocals, handclaps, direction
- John Lennon – guitar, percussion
- Earl Slick, Hugh McCracken – guitar
- Tony Levin – bass guitar
- George Small – keyboards
- Arthur Jenkins – percussion, handclaps
- Andy Newmark – drums
