= Every Man Has a Woman Who Loves Him =

1980 song by Yoko Ono

Song by Yoko Ono

from the album Double Fantasy
- Released: 17 November 1980
- Recorded: 1980
- Genre: Rock
- Length: 4:02
- Label: Geffen Records
- Songwriter: Yoko Ono
- Producers: John Lennon, Yoko Ono, Jack Douglas

"Every Man Has a Woman Who Loves Him"

Single by John Lennon

from the album Every Man Has a Woman
- A-side: "It's Alright" (Sean Lennon) (AA-side)
- Released: 16 November 1984
- Recorded: 1980
- Genre: Rock
- Length: 3:32
- Label: Polydor
- Songwriter: Yoko Ono
- Producer: John Lennon

John Lennon singles chronology
"I'm Stepping Out" (1984)	"Every Man Has a Woman Who Loves Him" (1984)	"Jealous Guy" (1985)

"Every Man Has a Woman Who Loves Him" is a song by Yoko Ono from the album Double Fantasy with John Lennon. Other versions were released, including one released as a single where Ono's voice was removed, leaving what had been Lennon's backing vocal as the primary vocal.

== Yoko Ono original version ==
Music lecturers Ben Urish and Ken Bielen described Ono's original version on Double Fantasy as having a "reggae feel." They regard the theme of the song to be the "preordained nature of soul mates" although the lyrics acknowledge that one might not find their soul mate in this lifetime. They point to the line "Why do I run, when I know you're the one" as recognizing that people may be hesitant to accept the inevitability of their soul mate. Beatle biographer John Blaney feels that the theme restates much of what Ono had already sung on the album in "Beautiful Boys." According to Ono, the song is "about love."

Ultimate Classic Rock critic Michael Gallucci rated this version to be Ono's 5th best song, preferring it to the version with only Lennon's vocals.

== John Lennon version ==
A new version of the song was created for the compilation album Every Man Has a Woman. It stripped away Ono's lead vocal, while bringing Lennon's backing vocal up in the mix, thus making it effectively a John Lennon song. Ono can still be heard singing effectively backup in parts of the refrain. Besides eliminating Ono's lead vocal, this version also eliminates a short instrumental part.

Ben Urish and Ken Bielen speculate that Lennon created this mix before he died in anticipation of putting together an album of other artists performing Ono's songs as a birthday present to her. The song had been recorded on an alternate copy on September 22, 1980 during the mixing of Double Fantasy. Although the recording was available, it was not included on the original release of Milk and Honey in 1984.

It was released as a single with B-side featuring "It's Alright" by Ono and Sean Lennon. In fact, this was the last unreleased or "new" John Lennon song to be released as a single; it failed to chart in the United Kingdom but charted at #52 on the Mainstream Rock chart in the United States. This version was included on the 1990 Lennon compilation album Lennon. It was also released as a bonus track on the CD reissue of Milk and Honey in 2001.

In 2007, the song was re-released as a UK-only 12" single on the Nynx record label where it was coupled with Elvis Costello's cover version of Yoko Ono's song "Walking on Thin Ice".

Blaney criticized this version for using Lennon's harmony vocal as a lead vocal, which, according to Blaney "it is not."

=== Personnel ===
This is the personnel according to the John Lennon Website.

- John Lennon – vocals, guitar, keyboards
- Yoko Ono – vocals
- Earl Slick – guitar
- Hugh McCracken – guitar
- Tony Levin – bass guitar
- George Small – keyboards
- Ed Walsh – Oberheim
- Andy Newmark – drums
- Arthur Jenkins – percussion
- George "Young" Opalisky – saxophone

=== Track listing ===
- UK 7" single

A. "Every Man Has a Woman Who Loves Him" (by John Lennon) – 3:32
AA. "It's Alright" (by Sean Lennon) – 2:26

== "Everyman... Everywoman..." ==
"Everyman... Everywoman..."

Single by Yoko Ono

from the album Open Your Box
- Released: 2004
- Genre: Rock, dance
- Label: Mind Train, Twisted Records
- Songwriter: Yoko Ono
- Producers: John Lennon, Yoko Ono, Jack Douglas

Yoko Ono singles chronology
"Hell in Paradise" (2004)	"Everyman... Everywoman..." (2004)	"You're the One" (2007)

"Every Man Has a Woman Who Loves Him" was later released as a single by Yoko Ono in 2004 under the title "Everyman... Everywoman...". The lyrics were altered for this version to allow for same-sex relationships. A remix version by Blow-Up was later included on Ono's 2007 remix album Yes, I'm a Witch. Allmusic critic Thom Jurek called the Blow-Up remix "a full-on psychedelic rave-up worthy of the Kinks circa 1965.

=== Track listing ===
- Digital download
1. "Everyman... Everywoman..." (Basement Jaxx Classix MAN2MAN Mix) – 4:02
2. "Everyman... Everywoman..." (Murk Space Miami Mix) – 5:17
3. "Everyman... Everywoman..." (Dave Audé Radio Edit) – 3:51
4. "Everyman... Everywoman..." (Blow-Up Radio Edit) – 3:57
5. "Everyman... Everywoman..." (Basement Jaxx Night Dub) – 5:45
6. "Everyman... Everywoman..." (Ralphi Rosario Main Mix) – 8:04
7. "Everyman... Everywoman..." (DJ Vibe Mix) – 8:05
8. "Everyman... Everywoman..." (Passengerz Ono Mixshow) – 6:24
9. "Everyman... Everywoman..." (Dave Audé Dub) – 8:27
10. "Everyman... Everywoman..." (Basement Jaxx Club Mix 2) – 7:11
11. "Everyman... Everywoman..." (Blow Up Plastic Mix) – 5:42
12. "Everyman... Everywoman..." (Basement Jaxx Classix Mix) – 4:00

=== Charts ===
Chart (2004)	Peak position
US Dance Club Songs (Billboard)	1

== See also ==
- List of number-one dance singles of 2004 (U.S.)
