= Beautiful Boy (Darling Boy) =

1980 single by John Lennon

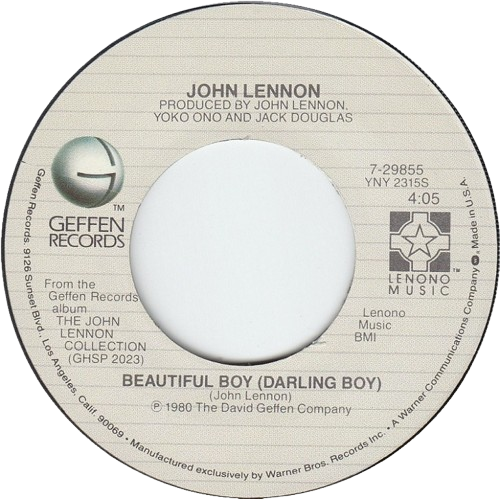
- B-side label of the 1982 US single

Single by John Lennon

from the album Double Fantasy
- A-side: "Watching the Wheels"
- Released: 11 April 1981
- Recorded: 1980
- Genre: Pop rock
- Length: 4:02
- Label: Geffen
- Songwriter: John Lennon
- Producers: John Lennon; Yoko Ono; Jack Douglas

John Lennon singles chronology
"Woman" (1981)	"Beautiful Boy (Darling Boy)" (1981)	"Love" (1982)

Music video
- "Beautiful Boy (Darling Boy)" on YouTube

"Beautiful Boy (Darling Boy)" is a song written and performed by John Lennon for his 1980 album Double Fantasy, the final studio release issued by Lennon and Yoko Ono during his lifetime. Addressed to Lennon's son Sean, the track is noted for its gentle, reassuring tone and its themes of parental affection and optimism.

The song has been widely praised by Lennon's contemporaries. Paul McCartney has described it as one of his favourite Lennon compositions; when he appeared on Desert Island Discs in 1982, he selected it as his preferred track, and Ono made the same choice when she appeared on the programme in 2007.

"Beautiful Boy (Darling Boy)" was first issued as the B-side of "Watching the Wheels" in March 1981. It was later used as the B-side of "Happy Xmas (War Is Over)" to promote the compilation album The John Lennon Collection in November 1982.

== Lyrics ==
Written for his young son Sean, the song opens with Lennon comforting him after what appears to be a nightmare. It then moves into a gentle meditation on parenthood, expressing reassurance, affection and a sense of wonder at watching a child grow.

The lyrics include the widely quoted line, "Life is what happens to you while you're busy making other plans", a phrase attributed to Allen Saunders in a 1957 issue of Reader's Digest.

"Beautiful Boy (Darling Boy)" has been used in several films. In Mr. Holland's Opus (1995), the title character performs the song for his deaf son in an effort to repair their strained relationship. In Mr. Peabody and Sherman (2014), it accompanies a montage depicting Mr. Peabody meeting and adopting Sherman.

== Personnel ==
- John Lennon – vocals, acoustic guitar, vocoder
- Earl Slick – acoustic guitar
- Hugh McCracken – lead guitar
- Tony Levin – bass guitar
- George Small – keyboards
- Robert Greenidge – steelpan
- Arthur Jenkins – percussion
- Randy Stein – English concertina

== Certifications ==
Certifications
Region	Certification	Certified units/sales
New Zealand (RMNZ)	Gold	15,000^{‡}
United Kingdom (BPI) 2011 release	Silver	200,000^{‡}
^{‡} Sales+streaming figures based on certification alone.

== Celine Dion version ==
"Beautiful Boy"

Promotional single by Celine Dion

from the album Miracle
- Released: 4 October 2004
- Recorded: 2004
- Studio: Digital Insights; Chartmarker; Sony
- Genre: Pop
- Length: 3:53
- Label: Columbia; Epic
- Songwriter: John Lennon
- Producer: David Foster

Audio
- "Beautiful Boy" on YouTube

Celine Dion recorded "Beautiful Boy" for her 2004 album Miracle. The track was issued on 4 October 2004 in North America and selected European territories as the album's first promotional single. Dion promoted the song with several US television appearances, including a performance on Live with Regis and Kelly.

=== Commercial performance ===
The recording achieved moderate commercial success. It reached number two on the Quebec radio chart and performed well on adult contemporary formats, peaking at number 18 in the United States and number 23 in Canada. In Hungary, it reached number 30 on the national airplay chart.

=== Charts ===
==== Weekly charts ====
Weekly chart performance
Chart (2004–2005)	Peak position
Canada AC (Radio & Records)	23
Hungary (Rádiós Top 40)	30
Quebec Radio Songs (ADISQ)	2
US Adult Contemporary (Billboard)	18

==== Year-end charts ====
2004 year-end chart performance
Chart (2004)	Position
US Adult Contemporary (Radio & Records)	88

2005 year-end chart performance
Chart (2005)	Position
US Adult Contemporary (Radio & Records)	75
