= Beautiful Boys =

Yoko Ono song

Single by Yoko Ono

from the album Double Fantasy
- A-side: "Woman"
- Released: 12 January 1981 (US); 16 January 1981 (UK)
- Genre: Rock
- Length: 2:54
- Label: Geffen
- Songwriter: Yoko Ono
- Producers: John Lennon, Yoko Ono, Jack Douglas

Yoko Ono singles chronology
| "Kiss Kiss Kiss" (1980) | "Beautiful Boys" (1981) | "Walking on Thin Ice" (1981) |

"Beautiful Boys" is a song written by Yoko Ono that was first released on Ono's and John Lennon's 1980 album Double Fantasy. It was later released as the B-side of Lennon's number-one single "Woman".

The first verse of "Beautiful Boys" is directed at Ono and Lennon's young son Sean, culminating in the line "don't be afraid to cry". On the album this comes off as a companion piece to Lennon's song "Beautiful Boy (Darling Boy)", which Lennon directed to Sean. The second verse is directed at her husband John, with lines such as "your mind has changed the world". Finally the last verse is directed at all men and she tells them not to be afraid to "go to hell and back" as they go through life. Music critic Johnny Rogan sees this line as encouraging exploration and notes that the last line "don't be afraid to be afraid" serves as a "gentle warning". Lennon said of this line:

I'm not afraid to be afraid, though it's always scary. But it's more painful to try not to be yourself. People spend a lot of time trying to be someone else.

The last verse is sung over backward noises and sounds that give the verse an "uneasy atmosphere", according to music lecturers Ben Urish and Ken Bielen. Urish and Bielen see the last verse as a response to "Woman", which in their view Lennon directed towards all women.

Beatle biographer John Blaney also sees this song as a companion to "Woman" stating that "Ono's analysis of her relationship with Lennon was insightful and honest. It flattered and encouraged, expressing everything that a loving wife would wish for her husband." Urish and Bielen contrast this song, which challenges people "to accept that a well-lived life will have heartbreak and danger" with Lennon's songs on the album whose themes are reassurance and acceptance. Music journalist Charles Shaar Murray similarly stated that Ono's verse about Lennon showed that "her love and admiration for her husband are considerably more clear-eyed than his for her; he writes about her as an omnipotent, benevolent, life-giving Natural Force; she writes about him as a gifted human who is still a child." Rogan feels that the verse about Lennon reveals an interesting aspect of his psychology with the line "You got all you can carry/And still feel somehow empty." Ono biographer Jerry Hopkins sees the first two verses as illustrating that Sean and John are much alike despite Sean being 4 years old when the song was written while John was 39. Tom Sowa of The Spokesman-Review described the song as a "tender, melancholic comment with a light musical touch". Orlando Sentinel critic Noel Holston regarded "Beautiful Boys" as the most beautiful song on the entire album. New Musical Express critics Roy Carr and Tony Tyler describe "Beautiful Boys" as "an eerie lament which is not so much a gloomy feminist assessment as an instinctive matriarch's perception of 'Man-as-child.'"

In an interview with Playboy Ono said of the song that:

It is a message to men. John and Sean inspired me, but the third verse is about all the beautiful boys of the world. That's sort of like the extension of the idea. I had relationships with men, but it was always "You know where the door is." I didn't really trouble to find out what their needs were, what their pains were. With John, that changed. He found out my pain, and I had to find out his pain...The world consists of men and women—there is no denying that. It is important men and women recognize each other and work with each other. It's really a message to men—reaching out to men to understand.

Keyboardist George Small stated that he regarded "Beautiful Boys" as the most avant garde song on Double Fantasy because of Hugh McCracken's "flamenco, Spanish-flavored guitar solo", as well as some backwards guitar that reminded him of Beatles' songs such as "I'm Only Sleeping". Assistant engineer Jon Smith stated that they incorporated sound effects from Star Wars battles into the song. Originally they did so by playing the movie soundtrack through noise gates that were triggered to turn on when drummer Andy Newmark hit his tom-toms, thus timing the sound effects to the drums. Ono thought this ruined the mood of the song and so they simply left the sound effects low in the mix without timing them to the drums.
