= George Small (musician) =

American jazz musician

George Small is an American musician, composer and record producer, who is active in the New York music scene. He has a wide variety of credits that include hit recordings, live performances with musicians (Broadway, concert and TV) and extensive productions and original compositions. His keyboard work is featured on John Lennon & Yoko Ono's album Double Fantasy and the follow-up, Milk and Honey. He played downbeats on "(Just Like) Starting Over" and a piano accompaniment on "Watching the Wheels".

George Small has also worked with Carl Perkins, Graham Parker, artist Andy Warhol, Eric Clapton, John Phillips and many others.
