= Arthur Jenkins (musician) =

American jazz musician (1936–2009)

- Born: Arthur Eugene Jenkins Jr. December 7, 1936; The Bronx, New York, U.S.
- Died: January 28, 2009 (aged 72) Manhattan, New York, U.S.
- Genres: Pop; jazz; R&B
- Occupations: Musician; composer; arranger
- Instruments: Keyboard; percussion
- Education: Baldwin–Wallace College

Arthur Eugene Jenkins Jr. (December 7, 1936 – January 28, 2009) was an American keyboardist, composer, arranger, and percussionist who worked with many popular music icons, such as John Lennon, Harry Belafonte, Bob Marley, and Chaka Khan.

== Biography ==
Jenkins was born in The Bronx, New York, and began playing piano at the age of five. His early exposure to Latin music, specifically Cuban music styles, while growing up in the Bronx, proved to fortuitous for him as he found work in the Latin music scene as well as in jazz. After studying music at Baldwin–Wallace College in Ohio, Jenkins returned to New York and began his professional career. He played for two years at the Bronx-based nightclub called the Blue Morocco, where, for his first year, he accompanied the jazz singer Irene Reid, and in his second, a new vocalist from Ohio named Nancy Wilson.

Next, he began a nine-year collaboration as musical director and accompanist to singer Johnny Nash, which included Nash's 1972 hit "I Can See Clearly Now". While with Nash, Jenkins traveled to Jamaica, where he also worked on recording projects with Bob Marley and Peter Tosh.

Jenkins had now become a much sought-after studio musician, and soon was the arranger for Harry Belafonte, with whom he also recorded and toured. In the same capacity, he worked for Patti Austin and Lena Horne, who were co-performers on Belafonte's tours.

Jenkins then joined Antisia Publishing, co-owned by Ralph MacDonald and William Salter, and forged a lifelong friendship and musical partnership with MacDonald, which led to more hit recordings like "The Hustle" with Van McCoy, "Where Is the Love" with Roberta Flack and Donny Hathaway, and "Just The Two of Us" with Grover Washington Jr. and Bill Withers.

Jenkins was brought to the attention of John Lennon by May Pang, a production coordinator for many albums by Lennon and Yoko Ono. Pang booked Jenkins for Ono's album Feeling the Space (1973), and Lennon, who was about to record his album Mind Games, asked Pang to retain him for that session. Jenkins played on all subsequent Lennon albums, including Walls and Bridges (for which he was awarded an RIAA gold record), Rock 'n' Roll, Double Fantasy, and the posthumously-released Milk and Honey. Lennon would jokingly credit Jenkins for "all the bells and whistles" on his records.

Jenkins also worked on Broadway theatre and lent his distinctive sounds to popular commercials for McDonald's, Chemical Bank, and other products. He also released two CDs of his own material: Alone with Arthur and Alone with Arthur Again.

Jenkins died unexpectedly at his Manhattan apartment, aged 73.

== Discography ==
Jenkins began his recording career in 1965 with the album Latin Soul by the Latin Jazz Quintet; he has over a hundred credits to his name.

With Ron Carter

- Anything Goes (Kudu, 1975)

With Ronnie Foster

- Two Headed Freap (Blue Note, 1972)

With Dizzy Gillespie, Sonny Rollins, and Sonny Stitt

- Sonny Side Up (Verve, 1957)

With Chaka Khan

- Chaka (Warner Bros., 1978)
- Naughty (Warner Bros., 1980) – also plays clavinet and electric piano

With Rahsaan Roland Kirk

- The Case of the 3 Sided Dream in Audio Color (Atlantic, 1975)
- Other Folks' Music (Atlantic, 1976)

With John Lennon

- Walls and Bridges (Apple, 1974)
- Roots: John Lennon Sings the Great Rock & Roll Hits (Adam VIII, 1975)
- Rock 'n' Roll (Apple, 1975)
- Double Fantasy (Geffen, 1980)
- Milk and Honey (Geffen, 1984)

With Sabu Martinez

- Sabu's Jazz Espagnole (Alegre, 1960)

With David "Fathead" Newman

- Mr. Fathead (Warner Bros., 1976)

With Yoko Ono

- Feeling the Space (Apple, 1975)
- Season of Glass (Geffen, 1981)
- A Story (Rykodisc, 1997)

With Marlena Shaw

- From the Depths of My Soul (Blue Note, 1973)
