= Collaborations between ex-Beatles =

Past members of the Beatles collaborative efforts

After the break-up of the Beatles in April 1970, John Lennon, Paul McCartney, George Harrison and Ringo Starr enjoyed success as solo artists and collaborated with each other on numerous occasions, including on both studio and live recordings. However, only three of these collaborations included all four members: "Free as a Bird" (1995), "Real Love" (1996) and "Now and Then" (2023).

In the early 1970s, collaborations were common between Harrison and Starr, and between Lennon and either Harrison or Starr, but none of the three worked with McCartney over that time. The only album released during Lennon's lifetime that included compositions and performances by all four ex-Beatles, albeit on separate songs, was Starr's 1973 album Ringo. Starr's Ringo's Rotogravure (1976) also included compositions by all his bandmates (although Harrison did not play on the album), and the 1996 Carl Perkins album Go Cat Go! contained individual contributions by McCartney, Harrison and Starr, together with a Lennon recording from 1969. With Starr's participation, Harrison staged the Concert for Bangladesh in New York City in August 1971. Other than an unreleased jam session on March 28, 1974, later bootlegged as A Toot and a Snore in '74, Lennon and McCartney never recorded together again. Starr and McCartney have performed and recorded together on several occasions since Harrison's death in 2001.

Collaborations by the four ex-Beatles since the break-up are listed below. Collaborations that began before the break-up are included for historical interest. The start date of the collaboration, e.g., the recording start date, governs the initial display sequence. Other display sequences may be seen by clicking the buttons in the column headers.

== Albums ==
Year of recording	Year of release	Album	Credited to	Collaboration by Lennon	Collaboration by McCartney	Collaboration by Harrison	Collaboration by Starr
1967−68	1968	Wonderwall Music	George Harrison			Yes	Yes
1968−69	1969	Is This What You Want?	Jackie Lomax		Yes	Yes	Yes
1969	1970	Leon Russell	Leon Russell			Yes	Yes
1969–70	1970	Doris Troy	Doris Troy			Yes	Yes
1969−70	1970	Sentimental Journey	Ringo Starr		Yes		Yes
1969−70	1970	Encouraging Words	Billy Preston			Yes	Yes
1969	1972	Some Time in New York City (Live Jam)	John Lennon & Yoko Ono	Yes		Yes	
1969–70	1970	All Things Must Pass	George Harrison			Yes	Yes
1970	1970	John Lennon/Plastic Ono Band	John Lennon	Yes			Yes
1970	1970	Yoko Ono/Plastic Ono Band	Yoko Ono	Yes		Yes	Yes
1971	1971	Imagine	John Lennon	Yes		Yes	
1971	1971	Fly	Yoko Ono	Yes			Yes
1971	1971	The Concert for Bangladesh	George Harrison & Friends			Yes	Yes
1972	1972	Bobby Keys	Bobby Keys			Yes	Yes
1971	1972	Brother	Lon & Derrek Van Eaton			Yes	Yes
1972	1974	Son of Dracula	Harry Nilsson			Yes	Yes
1972	1973	Living in the Material World	George Harrison			Yes	Yes
1973	1973	Ringo	Ringo Starr	Yes	Yes	Yes	Yes
1973	1974	Shankar Family & Friends	Ravi Shankar			Yes	Yes
1973	1974	Dark Horse	George Harrison			Yes	Yes
1974	1992	A Toot and a Snore in '74 (bootleg)	Various artists	Yes	Yes		
1974	1974	Pussy Cats	Harry Nilsson	Yes			Yes
1974	1974	Goodnight Vienna	Ringo Starr	Yes			Yes
1975−1996	1996	Go Cat Go! (Carl Perkins tribute)	Various artists	Yes	Yes	Yes	Yes
1976	1976	Ringo's Rotogravure	Ringo Starr	Yes	Yes	Yes	Yes
1980−81	1981	Somewhere in England	George Harrison		Yes	Yes	Yes
1980−81	1981	Stop and Smell the Roses	Ringo Starr		Yes	Yes	Yes
1981−82	1982	Tug of War	Paul McCartney		Yes		Yes
1981−82	1983	Pipes of Peace	Paul McCartney		Yes		Yes
1982−83	1984	Give My Regards to Broad Street	Paul McCartney		Yes		Yes
1987	1987	Duane Eddy	Duane Eddy		Yes	Yes	
1987	1987	Cloud Nine	George Harrison			Yes	Yes
1989–90	1990	Armchair Theatre	Jeff Lynne			Yes	Yes
1990	1990	Nobody's Child: Romanian Angel Appeal	Various Artists (compiled by George Harrison)			Yes	Yes
1992	2014	Extra Texture (Read All About It) (2014 remaster)	George Harrison			Yes	Yes
1995−97	1997	Flaming Pie	Paul McCartney		Yes		Yes
1997−98	1998	Vertical Man	Ringo Starr		Yes	Yes	Yes
2000	2001	Zoom	Electric Light Orchestra			Yes	Yes
2009	2009	A Sideman's Journey	Klaus Voormann		Yes		Yes
2009	2010	Y Not	Ringo Starr		Yes		Yes
2017	2017	Give More Love	Ringo Starr		Yes		Yes
2019	2019	What's My Name	Ringo Starr		Yes		Yes
2023	2023	Rockstar	Dolly Parton		Yes		Yes
2021-25	2026	The Boys of Dungeon Lane	Paul McCartney		Yes		Yes

== Singles ==
Year of recording	Year of release	Single	Credited to	Collaboration by Lennon	Collaboration by McCartney	Collaboration by Harrison	Collaboration by Starr
1967	1967	"We Love You"	The Rolling Stones	Yes	Yes		
1968	1968	"Sour Milk Sea"	Jackie Lomax		Yes	Yes	Yes
1969	1969	"New Day"	Jackie Lomax		Yes	Yes	Yes
1969	1969	"Carolina in My Mind"	James Taylor		Yes	Yes	
1969	1970	"Que Sera, Sera (Whatever Will Be, Will Be)"	Mary Hopkin		Yes		Yes
1969	1969	"Cold Turkey"	Plastic Ono Band	Yes			Yes
1969	1969	"Don't Worry Kyoko (Mummy's Only Looking for Her Hand in the Snow)" ^{[b]}	Plastic Ono Band	Yes			Yes
1970	1970	"Instant Karma!"	Lennon, Ono and the Plastic Ono Band	Yes		Yes	
1970	1971	"It Don't Come Easy"	Ringo Starr			Yes	Yes
1970	1970	"My Sweet Lord"	George Harrison			Yes	Yes
1970	1970	"Isn't It a Pity"	George Harrison			Yes	Yes
1970	1970	"Mother"	Lennon, Ono and the Plastic Ono Band	Yes			Yes
1970	1970	"Why" ^{[c]}	Lennon, Ono and the Plastic Ono Band	Yes			Yes
1970	1971	"Touch Me" ^{[d]}	Lennon, Ono and the Plastic Ono Band	Yes			Yes
1971	1971	"Bangla Desh"	George Harrison			Yes	Yes
1971	1972	"Sweet Music"	Lon & Derrek Van Eaton			Yes	Yes
1971−72	1972	"Back Off Boogaloo"	Ringo Starr			Yes	Yes
1972−73	1973	"Photograph"	Ringo Starr			Yes	Yes
1972	1974	"Daybreak"	Harry Nilsson			Yes	Yes
1973	1973	"You're Sixteen"	Ringo Starr		Yes		Yes
1974	1974	"Only You"	Ringo Starr	Yes			Yes
1974	1975	"It's All Down to Goodnight Vienna"	Ringo Starr	Yes			Yes
1974	1974	"Ding Dong, Ding Dong"	George Harrison			Yes	Yes
1977 / 1994	1995	"Free as a Bird"	The Beatles	Yes	Yes	Yes	Yes
1979 / 1995	1996	"Real Love"	The Beatles	Yes	Yes	Yes	Yes
1979 / 1995 / 2023	2023	"Now and Then"	The Beatles	Yes	Yes	Yes	Yes
1980−81	1981	"All Those Years Ago"	George Harrison		Yes	Yes	Yes
1980−81	1981	"Wrack My Brain"	Ringo Starr			Yes	Yes
1981	1982	"Take It Away"	Paul McCartney		Yes		Yes
1982	1983	"So Bad"	Paul McCartney		Yes		Yes
1987	1987	"Devil's Radio" ^{[a]}	George Harrison			Yes	Yes
1987	1988	"When We Was Fab"	George Harrison			Yes	Yes
1996	1997	"Beautiful Night"	Paul McCartney		Yes		Yes
1997	1998	"La De Da"	Ringo Starr		Yes		Yes
2009	2010	"Walk with You"	Ringo Starr		Yes		Yes
2017	2017	"Show Me the Way"	Ringo Starr		Yes		Yes
2017	2017	"We're on the Road Again"	Ringo Starr		Yes		Yes
2019	2019	"Grow Old with Me"	Ringo Starr		Yes		Yes
2020	2020	"Here's to the Nights"	Ringo Starr		Yes		Yes
2023	2023	"Let It Be"	Dolly Parton featuring Paul McCartney, Ringo Starr, Peter Frampton and Mick Fleetwood		Yes		Yes
2023	2023	"Feeling The Sunlight"	Ringo Starr		Yes		Yes

=== Notes ===
^{a} Promo single only
^{b} Ono's B-side to Lennon's "Cold Turkey"
^{c} Ono's B-side to Lennon's "Mother"
^{d} Ono's B-side to Lennon's "Power to the People" in the US

== Live performances ==
Live performances featuring collaboration between two or more ex-Beatles. Separate appearance at the same event does not count.

Year	Event	Location	Collaboration by Lennon	Collaboration by McCartney	Collaboration by Harrison	Collaboration by Starr
1969	UNICEF charity concert; Lennon performed "Cold Turkey" and "Don't Worry Kyoko" with Harrison. This performance was later released on the album Some Time in New York City.	Lyceum Ballroom, London, England.	Yes		Yes	
1971	The Concert for Bangladesh	Madison Square Garden, New York			Yes	Yes
1979	Wedding of Eric Clapton and Pattie Boyd	Ewhurst, Surrey, England		Yes	Yes	Yes
1981	Wedding of Ringo Starr and Barbara Bach	London, England		Yes	Yes	Yes
1985	Rockabilly Session for Carl Perkins	Limehouse Television Studios, London, England			Yes	Yes
1987	The Prince's Trust All-Star Rock Concert	Wembley Arena, London			Yes	Yes
1988	Beatles Induction at Rock and Roll Hall of Fame	Waldorf-Astoria Hotel, Los Angeles			Yes	Yes
1992	Natural Law Party Benefit Concert	Royal Albert Hall, London			Yes	Yes
1993	Earth Day; Starr joined McCartney on stage for "Hey Jude" finale	Hollywood Bowl, Los Angeles		Yes		Yes
2002	Concert for George	Royal Albert Hall, London		Yes		Yes
2009	David Lynch Foundation "Change Begins Within" Benefit Concert	Radio City Music Hall, New York		Yes		Yes
2010	Ringo's 70th birthday show with Ringo Starr & His All-Starr Band (July 7); McCartney came onstage during the encore and played "Birthday" with Ringo and the band.	Radio City Music Hall, New York		Yes		Yes
2014	56th Annual Grammy Awards (January 26); McCartney and Starr performed the former's "Queenie Eye". The Beatles also received the Grammy Lifetime Achievement Award.	Staples Center, Los Angeles		Yes		Yes
2014	The Night That Changed America: A Grammy Salute to The Beatles (filmed January 27, aired February 9); McCartney and Starr performed "With a Little Help from My Friends" and "Hey Jude."	Los Angeles Convention Center, Los Angeles		Yes		Yes
2015	Ringo Starr Induction Into the Rock and Roll Hall of Fame (McCartney inducted Starr into the rock and roll hall of fame and the pair performed "With a Little Help From My Friends" and "I Wanna Be Your Man", with a little help from members of Green Day.	Rock and Roll Hall of Fame, Cleveland, Ohio		Yes		Yes
2018	At the performance in London on McCartney's 2018-2019 Freshen Up tour, the pair performed "Get Back", with Ronnie Wood.	The O_{2} Arena, London, England		Yes		Yes
2019	At the performance in Los Angeles and the last stop of McCartney's 2018-2019 Freshen Up tour, McCartney surprised the audience bringing Ringo Starr on stage and the pair performed "Sgt. Pepper's Lonely Hearts Club Band (Reprise)" and “Helter Skelter”.	Dodger Stadium, Los Angeles, California, USA		Yes		Yes
2024	At the performance in London and the last stop of McCartney's 2022-2024 Got Back tour, McCartney surprised the audience bringing Ringo Starr on stage and the pair performed "Sgt. Pepper's Lonely Hearts Club Band (Reprise)" and “Helter Skelter”.	The O_{2} Arena, London, England		Yes		Yes
