= William Arkle =

English painter, philosopher and composer

William Arkle (1924–2000) was an English painter, esoteric philosopher and composer. He was described by Colin Wilson as "among the half dozen most remarkable men I have ever met..."

William Arkle was born and educated in Bristol. During the Second World War he served as an engineering officer in the Royal Navy. After the war he trained as a painter at the Royal West of England Academy. Arkle's recognition as an artist culminated in his work being the major exhibit at the first Mind Body Spirit Festival in 1977. In the same year Arkle was the subject of a BBC television documentary in the series Life Story. His first book A Geography of Consciousness (1974) was focused on spiritual and philosophical themes. It was preceded by a booklet published in 1973, Letter From A Father, setting out Arkle's beliefs, as if written by God. A second book was published in 1977, The Great Gift, which concentrated on his paintings and poetry. Arkle composed music which was a precursor of the later ambient style. He collaborated with Robert John Godfrey and The Enid in providing artwork for their 1976 album In the Region of the Summer Stars. Godfrey later orchestrated three of Arkle's compositions for a 1986 cassette album The Music of William Arkle. This was re-released on CD in 2017.
