= Touch Me =

Touch Me may refer to:

== Film ==
- Touch Me (1997 film), an American drama-romance film directed by H. Gordon Boos
- Touch Me (2025 film), an American sci-fi horror comedy film directed by Addison Heimann

== Music ==
=== Albums ===
- Touch Me (The Enid album) or the title song, "Elegy (Touch Me)", 1979
- Touch Me (Gary Glitter album), 1973
- Touch Me (Samantha Fox album) or the title song (see below), 1986
- Touch Me (The Temptations album) or the title song, 1985
- Touch Me!, by Mai Kuraki, or the title song, 2009

=== Songs ===
- "Touch Me" (49ers song), 1989
- "Touch Me" (The Doors song), 1968
- "Touch Me" (Rising Star song), 1999
- "Touch Me" (Rui da Silva song) featuring Cassandra Fox, 2001
- "Touch Me" (Starley song), 2017
- "Touch Me" (Willie Nelson song), 1962
- "Touch Me" (Yoko Ono song), 1970
- "Touch Me" (Smash song), from the TV series Smash, 2012
- "Touch Me (All Night Long)", by Fonda Rae and Wish, 1984; covered by Cathy Dennis (1991) and Angel City (2004)
- "Touch Me (I Want Your Body)", by Samantha Fox, 1986
- "Touch Me", by Avicii from Stories, 2015
- "Touch Me", by Candyland and Ricci, 2016
- "Touch Me", by Chris Brown from Fortune, 2012
- "Touch Me", by Flo Rida from R.O.O.T.S., 2009
- "Touch Me", by Måneskin, a B-side of "Mammamia", 2021
- "Touch Me", by New Baccara, 1989
- "Touch Me", by PartyNextDoor from Partymobile, 2020
- "Touch Me", by Private Life; covered by Tia Carrere for the Wayne's World soundtrack, 1992
- "Touch Me", by Victoria Monét from Jaguar, 2020
- "Touch Me", from the musical Spring Awakening, 2006

== Other media ==
- Touch Me (arcade game), an Atari arcade game (1974) and handheld game (1978)
- Touch Me (novel), a 2000 novel by James Moloney

== See also ==
- "Touch Me, Touch Me", a 1967 song by Dave Dee, Dozy, Beaky, Mick & Tich
- "Touch-a, Touch-a, Touch-a, Touch Me", a 1973 song from The Rocky Horror Show and its 1975 film adaptation
