= Invicta (The Enid album) =

Studio album by the Enid
- Released: November 2012
- Recorded: August–October 2012
- Studio: The Lodge Recording Studio, Northampton, England
- Genre: Progressive rock
- Length: 52:21
- Label: Operation Seraphim
- Producer: Max Read, Robert John Godfrey

The Enid studio chronology
Journey's End (2010)	Invicta (2012)	First Light (2014)

Invicta is the fourteenth studio album by the British progressive rock band the Enid, released in 2012. Invicta is the second album in a planned trilogy that began with its predecessor, 2010's Journey's End.

== Track listing ==
No.	Title	Writer(s)	Length
1.	"Anthropy"	Godfrey, Read	1:04
2.	"One and the Many"	Godfrey, Payne	10:22
3.	"Who Created Me?"	Ducker, Godfrey, Payne, Read, Storey	5:39
4.	"Execution Mob"	Ducker, Payne, Read, Storey	4:06
5.	"Witch Hunt"	Ducker, Godfrey, Payne, Read, Storey	6:36
6.	"Heaven's Gate"	Ducker, Godfrey, Payne	9:09
7.	"Leviticus"	Ducker, Godfrey, Payne, Read, Storey	6:03
8.	"Villain of Science"	Ducker, Godfrey, Payne, Storey	5:03
9.	"The Whispering"	Godfrey, Payne, Read	4:22

== Personnel ==
The Enid

- Robert John Godfrey - keyboards
- Max Read - guitar, vocals
- Dave Storey - drums, percussion
- Jason Ducker - guitars
- Joe Payne - vocals
- Nicholas Willes - bass, percussion

Production

- Max Read - production, mixing, engineer
- Jason Ducker - engineer
- Robert John Godfrey - production
- Joe Payne - lyrics
- Bob Read - cover art
