= First Light (The Enid album) =

Studio album by The Enid
- Released: October 6, 2014
- Recorded: The Lodge Recording Studio, Northampton, England; August–September 2014
- Genre: Progressive rock
- Length: 58:46
- Label: Operation Seraphim
- Producer: Max Read, Robert John Godfrey

The Enid studio chronology
Invicta (2012)	First Light (2014)	The Bridge (2015)

First Light is the fifteenth studio album by the British progressive rock group the Enid, released on 6 October 2014. The album is mostly made up of newly re-recorded arrangements by the current line-up, of songs from the band's back-catalogue, plus two brand new tracks, which will be featured on forthcoming Enid albums, and a live version of "Mayday Galliard". Fans who pre-ordered the album from the band's website before 21 September each had their name printed on the sleeve notes of the CD.

== Track listing ==
No.	Title	Length
1.	"Someone Shall Rise"	5:14
2.	"Wings"	5:04
3.	"Leviticus"	6:33
4.	"One and the Many"	10:01
5.	"Terra Firma"	6:33
6.	"Dark Hydraulic"	12:48
7.	"Mocking Bird"	6:01
8.	"Mayday Galliard" (live)	6:37

== Personnel ==
The Enid

- Robert John Godfrey - keyboards, vocals
- Dave Storey - drums, percussion
- Max Read - guitars, bass, vocoder
- Jason Ducker - guitars
- Dominic Tofield - bass, percussion, guitar
- Joe Payne - vocals

Production

- Max Read - engineering, production
- Jason Ducker - engineering
- Robert John Godfrey - production
- Joe Payne - lyrics
- Dominic Tofield - cover art
