= Aerie Faerie Nonsense =

1977 album by The Enid

Studio album by the Enid
- Released: 1977
- Length: 36:08
- Label: EMI
- Producer: John Sinclair

The Enid chronology
In the Region of the Summer Stars (1976)	Aerie Faerie Nonsense (1977)	Touch Me (1979)

Aerie Faerie Nonsense is the Enid's second album. It was released in 1977 by EMI and later re-released by the Enid in 1983 following its deletion from the EMI catalogue.

== Release ==
Aerie Faerie Nonsense was recorded at Morgan Studios during August–September 1977 and released that year on EMI Records. EMI deleted it from their catalogue soon after.

In 1983, frustrated by the unavailability of the album, the Enid reconstructed it so that they could re-release it by themselves. They re-recorded all the tracks except Ondine. It was released on vinyl LP with slightly altered track names and the poem "To Sleep" by John Keats featured on the album cover. In 1985 Robert John Godfrey and Stephen Stewart recorded an extended version of Fand that was released for the fan club. This extended version appears on CD releases.

In June 2010, following the Inner Sanctum releases, EMI agreed to grant an exclusive worldwide license for the original EMI release of the album to Operation Seraphim. The album was subsequently transferred from the original 30 ips 1/4 inch Dolby A tapes to 96 kHz 24 bit digital by Christian Curtis at Abbey Road. The tracks were mastered for CD by Max Read at The Lodge Recording Studio. The CD Artwork was taken from the original releases and incorporated into an eight-page booklet. The album was released on 15 July 2010 and made available from The Enid’s online shop.

== Track listing ==
=== Original 1977 Version ===
Side one

1. "Prelude" (Godfrey) – (1:20)
2. "Mayday Galliard" (Godfrey) – (6:09)
3. "Ondine" (Godfrey, Lickerish) – (4:01)
4. "Childe Roland" (Godfrey, Lickerish) – (7:09)

Side two

1. "Fand I" (Godfrey, Lickerish) – (11:46)
2. "Fand II" (Godfrey) – (5:41)

=== 1983 re-issue ===
Aerie Faerie Nonsense (1983 Re-Issue)

Studio album by the Enid
- Released: 1983
- Length: 48:17
- Label: Various, Operation Seraphim

Side one

1. A Heroe's Life "Childe Roland to the Dark Tower Came" (Godfrey, Lickerish, Steward) – (7:09)
2. Ondine "Dear sweet thing of wonderful beauty, Roland's childe" (Godfrey) – (3:47)
3. Interlude (Godfrey) – (1:00)
4. Bridal Dance "Mayday Galliard" (Godfrey) – (6:39)

Side two

1. Fand
  1. 1st Movement
    1. Isle Of Brooding Solitude (Godfrey) – (2:51)
    2. The Silver Ship – Landfall (Godfrey, Lickerish, Stewart) – (5:02)
    3. The Grand Loving (Robert John Godfrey, Lickerish, Stewart) – (9:37)
  2. 2nd Movement
    1. Love/Death...The Immolation of Fand (Godfrey) – (12:09)

== Personnel ==
- Robert John Godfrey - keyboards
- Stephen Stewart - guitars, bass
- Francis Lickerish - guitars
- Charlie Elston - keyboards
- Terry "Thunderbags" Pack - bass
- Dave Storey - drums, percussion
- Dave Hancock - trumpet

1983 version

- Glen Tollet - bass
- Chris North - drums, percussion

Additional personnel

- Angus Boucher - executive producer
- John Sinclair - producer
- Gary Lyons - engineer
- Dean Pywell - sleeve design
- Colin Dunbar - original concept
