= Secret Green =

British rock band

- Origin: England
- Genres: Progressive rock, folk rock
- Years active: 2007–present
- Labels: Holyground Records
- Members: Francis Lickerish; Hilary Palmer; Jon Beedle; William Gilmour; Matt Hodge; Dave Brooks; Paul Carr; Jamie Brooks; Mike Hicks; Brian Mitchell
- Website: Official website

Secret Green was a British rock band, founded in 2007, by Francis Lickerish, Hilary Palmer, and Jon Beedle; later additions William Gilmour and Matt Hodge completed the line-up. Musicians Paul Carr, Dave Brooks, Jamie Brooks, Brian Mitchell, and Mike Hicks were employed for live work.

Guitarist, lutenist, and composer Francis Lickerish was a founder member of the art-rock band The Enid. Along with Robert John Godfrey and William Gilmour, he was one of the main contributors to The Enid's sound. He has also appeared as a session musician in several unexpected places, such as Kim Wilde's "Kids in America", and on former Incredible String Band member Malcolm LeMaistre's solo album.

After a 20-year break from music, Lickerish began writing Secret Green's To Wake the King album in 2006, which was released in May 2009.

== Discography ==
=== Albums ===
- To Wake The King (2009) – Holyground (HG137)
- Far and Forgot – From the Lost Lands (2012) – Secret Green (SG1)
