= Touch Me (The Enid album) =

Studio album by the Enid
- Released: 1979
- Recorded: November 1978–January 1979
- Genre: Progressive rock
- Label: Pye
- Producer: The Enid

The Enid chronology
Aerie Faerie Nonsense (1976)	Touch Me (1979)	Six Pieces (1979)

Touch Me is the third album by the British progressive rock band the Enid. It was released in 1979.

== Track listing ==
1. "Charades I) Humouresque" - (6:17)
2. "Charades II) Cortege" - (5:11)
3. "Charades III) Elegy (Touch Me)" - (3:17)
4. "Charades IV) Gallavant" - (7:14)
5. "Albion Fair" - (16:00)

== Personnel ==
The Enid

- Robert John Godfrey - keyboards
- Stephen Stewart - guitars, bass
- Francis Lickerish - guitars
- William Gilmour - keyboards
- Terry "Thunderbags" Pack - bass
- David Storey - drums
- Tony Freer - Cor Anglais, oboe
