= William Gilmour (musician) =

British musician and artist

William Gilmour is a British musician and artist who was an early member and keyboardist of rock band The Enid, before leaving to form his own band: Craft. He is now a retired music teacher having worked at Culloden Academy in Inverness. He is a contributing composer and performer for Francis Lickerish's band Secret Green.
