= Plastic Ono Band (disambiguation) =

Plastic Ono Band may refer to:

- Plastic Ono Band, the band in its various incarnations
- John Lennon/Plastic Ono Band, the debut solo album by English rock musician John Lennon
- Yoko Ono/Plastic Ono Band, the avant-garde debut album by Yoko Ono
