= In the Region of the Summer Stars =

1976 album by The Enid

- Original 1976 album cover

Studio album by The Enid
- Released: 1976
- Genre: Progressive rock
- Length: 38:56
- Label: EMI
- Producer: John Sinclair

The Enid chronology
In the Region of the Summer Stars (1976)	Aerie Faerie Nonsense (1977)

In the Region of the Summer Stars is the debut album by progressive rock band the Enid. It is based on the tarot sequence and on the writings of Charles Williams. It was released in 1976 by EMI. A new version was released on the band's own label in 1984 following its deletion from the EMI catalogue. In 2010, to forestall an alleged bootleg version, EMI licensed the original version to the band's own label.

== Background and recording ==
In the Region of the Summer Stars was originally composed as a largely vocal album, but recording plans had to be reviewed when Peter Roberts, the band's singer, killed himself on New Year's Day 1975. It was decided by the remaining band members that Roberts was irreplaceable, and subsequently the band reconstructed the music to be purely instrumental. The original name decided for the album was The Voyage of the Acolyte, However, then-Genesis guitarist Steve Hackett's debut album featured the same name and a similar concept.

== Release ==
In the Region of the Summer Stars was recorded at Sarm Studio during late 1974 and the winter-spring of 1975 and released in 1976 on BUK Records, a label owned by EMI. EMI deleted it from their catalogue soon after and lost the multi-track tapes for side two.

In 1984, frustrated by the unavailability of the album, The Enid reconstructed it so that they could re-release it by themselves with substantial alterations made to the arrangements. The multi-track tapes for the music on side one came into their possession and so they were able to use most of them. Side one was essentially the same except that "Fool" was extended and some completely fresh music was added. Side two had to be completely re-recorded. It was re-recorded and mixed by Stephen Stewart and Robert John Godfrey at The Lodge Recording Studio near Clare, Suffolk. John Southard of TRAD Electronics provided them with the means to achieve the technical quality of the recording. It was digitally mastered and released on vinyl LP with slightly altered track names and "The Father and the Mother" by William Arkle as the new album cover.

In June 2010, following what The Enid believe to be poor quality illegal bootlegs released by Inner Sanctum, EMI agreed to grant an exclusive worldwide licence for the original EMI release of the album to Operation Seraphim. The album was subsequently transferred from the original 30IPS 1/4 inch Dolby A tapes to 96 kHz 24 bit digital by Christian Curtis at Abbey Road. The tracks were mastered for CD by Max Read at The Lodge recording studio. The CD artwork was taken from the original releases and incorporated into an eight-page booklet. The album was released on 15 July 2010 and made available from The Enid’s online shop.

== Track listing ==
=== Original 1976 version ===
- All music composed and arranged by members of The Enid.

Side one

1. "The Fool/The Falling Tower" (Robert John Godfrey, Francis Lickerish) - (6:16)
2. "Death, the Reaper" (Godfrey, Lickerish) - (3:59)
3. "The Lovers" (Godfrey) - (5:17)
4. "The Devil" (Godfrey, Lickerish) - (4:14)

Side two

1. "The Sun" (Godfrey, Lickerish) - (4:39)
2. "The Last Judgement" (Godfrey, Lickerish) - (8:12)
3. "In the Region of the Summer Stars" (Godfrey, Lickerish, Glen Tollet) - (6:19)

=== 1984 reissue ===
In the Region of the Summer Stars (1984 reissue)
- 1984 reissue cover.

Studio album by The Enid
- Released: 1984
- Genre: Progressive rock
- Length: 43:09
- Labels: Various, Operation Seraphim (Current)

- Track titles were changed "largely on a whim", and the closing passages of Side 2 were rewritten by Godfrey in response to William Arkle's painting

Side one

1. "Fool" (Godfrey) – (2:43)
2. "The Tower of Babel" (Godfrey, Lickerish, Stewart) – (5:05)
3. "The Reaper" (Godfrey, Lickerish, Stewart) – (4:03)
4. "The Loved Ones" (Godfrey) – (5:20)
5. "The Demon King" (Godfrey, Lickerish, Stewart) – (4:18)

Side two

1. "Pre-Dawn" (Godfrey) – (1:12)
2. "Sunrise" (Godfrey) – (3:27)
3. "The Last Day" (Godfrey, Lickerish, Stewart) – (7:59)
4. "The Flood" (Godfrey, Stewart) – (1:12)
5. "Under The Summer Stars" (Godfrey, Lickerish, Stewart, Tollet) – (5:42)
6. "Adieu" (Godfrey) – (3:03)

CD Bonus tracks

The Enid label, 1988

- "Reverberations" (Godfrey) - (18:34)

Godfrey solo piece

InnerSanctum, 2001; WHD Entertainment, Inc. (Japan), 2006

- "Judgement" (Godfrey, Lickerish)
- "In the Region of the Summer Stars" (Godfrey, Lickerish, Tollet)

Rough mixes from original recording, previously unreleased

== Personnel ==
=== 1976 version ===
- Robert John Godfrey - keyboards
- Stephen Stewart - guitars
- Francis Lickerish - guitars
- Glen Tollet - bass, tuba, keyboards
- Neil Kavanagh - flute
- Dave Storey - drums, percussion
- Dave Hancock - trumpet

Additional personnel

- Angus Boucher - executive producer
- John Sinclair - producer
- Gary Lyons - engineer
- Dean Pywell - sleeve design
- Richard Evans - logo
- Colin Dunbar - original concept

==== 2001 reissue ====
- Christian Curtis (Abbey Road Studios): Digital transfer
- Max Read: CD Mastering

=== 1984 version ===
All musicians as above except Dave Hancock, and with the addition of:

- Chris North - drums, percussion (side 2)
- Neil Mitchell - trumpet

Production

- Robert John Godfrey, Stephen Stewart - production, mixing
- John Southard (TRAD Electronics) - technical assistance
- William Arkle - cover art [except on the 2006 WHD Entertainment (Japan) reissue, which confusingly uses the 1976 artwork]
