= Mister God, This Is Anna =

1974 book by Sydney Hopkins

- Author: Fynn (pseudonym of Sydney Hopkins)
- Illustrator: William Papas
- Publisher: William Collins Sons & Co. Ltd
- Publication date: 1974

Mister God, This Is Anna is a book by Sydney Hopkins under the pseudonym "Fynn" describing the adventures of Anna, a young yet wise four-year-old whom Fynn finds as a runaway. Nineteen-year-old Fynn takes Anna home to his mother, who takes her in, though Fynn becomes Anna's main carer and closest friend. Fynn recounts his time spent with Anna, and gives a very personal account of her outpourings on life, mathematics, science, and her mentor, Mister God. The sequels of Mister God, This Is Anna are Anna's Book (1986) and Anna and the Black Knight (1990).

The book was reissued by HarperCollins in 2005 with a foreword by Rowan Williams, Archbishop of Canterbury.

== Plot summary ==
The story begins on the streets of the East End of London in the mid-1930s. While roaming the docks at night, the author comes across a small girl sitting on the grating below a shop window. He sits down next to her, and engages her in conversation. Unable to find out where she came from, Fynn takes the child home, only to discover she is an abused runaway. She spends her next three years as Fynn's inseparable companion.

The book gives an account of their friendship. Anna by nature is the inquisitor, the forever probing creature who likes to find a reason for everything. Fynn, a student, tries to follow her hard-to-understand, yet simple logic. Philosophical questions are investigated through the eyes of a child, who proposes simple, common-sense solutions. Many of the conversations involve religion, with Anna personalising God, calling him "Mister God".

"At five years Anna knew absolutely the purpose of being, knew the meaning of love and was a personal friend and helper of Mister God. At six Anna was a theologian, mathematician, philosopher, poet, and gardener. If you asked her a question, you would always get an answer – in due course. On some occasions the answer would be delayed for weeks or months; but eventually, in her own good time, the answer would come: direct, simple and much to the point."

Anna is involved with everything. The gist of the book is the philosophy of a child who has the wisdom to comprehend more than what would be expected of her.

The ending of the book describes Anna's death at age seven after falling from a tree and Fynn's profound grief. "She never made eight years, she died by an accident. She died with a grin on her beautiful face. She died saying, 'I bet Mister God lets me get into heaven for this'." Fynn experiences a period of angst, blaming God, but when he visits Anna's grave and sees it to be a riot of flowers, he lets go of his anger against God. The answer, he realizes, is "Anna is in my middle". This particular reference is to a conversation between Anna and Fynn. God is part of everybody, and everybody is part of God. Fynn walks away from her graveyard with renewed hope.

== Author ==
Sydney George Hopkins (26 March 1919 – 3 July 1999), as a teenager and young adult, lived in the East End of London in the early 1930s. He was briefly drawn towards the politics of Oswald Mosley, but soon became disillusioned. He won a scholarship to a local grammar school, Cooper's Company College, London E3, and left aged 15 to work for The Russian Oil and Petroleum Company, where he had aspirations of becoming a research chemist. Following a fall off a cliff he suffered chronic insomnia and in 1939 was referred to Finchden Manor in Kent, a therapeutic community run by George Lyward O.B.E., and later joined the staff.

Theologian Vernon Sproxton commented that Hopkins' "most formative thinking took place far from the quads and colleges and punted rivers amongst the small streets, warehouses, and canals of the East End. But with his modest job and his Woolworth's do-it-yourself laboratory he produced thought to which few PhDs have approximated."

It is not clear to what extent the story is autobiographical, and how much is fictional. In his preface to both the British and American editions of the book, Vernon Sproxton remarks that he has seen Anna's drawings and notes and that he believes her to be real.

There is some uncertainty about Fynn's age on first encountering Anna. Early editions of the book say he was nineteen, but this would be impossible if he was to know Anna for three years before the outbreak of war, and in the latest editions of Mister God, This Is Anna his age has been amended to sixteen.

== Sources ==
- Mr Lyward's Answer by Michael Burn (Hamish Hamilton, 1956)
- George Lyward – His Autobiography by John Lyward (Lulu, 2008)
