= Jon Beedle =

British guitarist and songwriter

Jon Beedle (born Jonathan Shanon Beedle, 1 March 1961, Hemel Hempstead) is a British guitarist and songwriter.

Beedle is a freelance guitarist and songwriter, specialising in the rock, jazz, blues and jazz fusion genres. He has collaborated with many musicians, including Deep Purple keyboard player Don Airey, and the saxophonist Snake Davis.

He is also a full-time member of the band, Secret Green, and endorses Sabre Guitars.

== Discography ==
=== Albums ===
- Jon Beedle - Long Time Coming (2005) (Electric Boogie Productions)
- Secret Green - To Wake The King (2009) (Holyground HG137)
