= The Night That Changed America: A Grammy Salute to the Beatles =

- Written by: David Wild; Kenneth Ehrlich
- Directed by: Gregg Gelfand
- Presented by: Kate Beckinsale; Jeff Bridges; Johnny Depp; Sean Penn; LL Cool J; Eric Idle; Anna Kendrick
- Narrated by: Eric Idle
- Country of origin: United States
- Original language: English

Production
- Executive producers: Kenneth Ehrlich; Rac Clark
- Producer: AEG Ehrlich Ventures
- Production locations: West Hall, Los Angeles Convention Center, California
- Running time: 150 minutes

Original release
- Network: CBS (USA); ITV (UK)
- Release: February 9, 2014 (USA) May 2, 2014 (UK)

The Night That Changed America: A Grammy Salute to the Beatles is a television program and tribute to English rock group the Beatles. It aired on CBS on February 9, 2014 (original) and February 12, 2014 (rerun) in the United States and ITV in the United Kingdom on May 2, 2014. The tribute, presented by the Recording Academy, AEG Ehrlich Ventures and the CBS television network, commemorated the legacy of the band and marked the 50th anniversary of their first performance on The Ed Sullivan Show. Kenneth Ehrlich served as executive producer, with Rac Clark as co-executive producer. The production was written by David Wild and Ehrlich and directed by Gregg Gelfand.

== Description ==
The program, presented by the Recording Academy, AEG Ehrlich Ventures and CBS, serves as a tribute to the legacy of the Beatles and the 50th anniversary of their first appearance on The Ed Sullivan Show. Scheduled to air on February 9, 2014, the concert was filmed on January 27, 2014 at the Los Angeles Convention Center's West Hall, located in Los Angeles, California, one day following the 56th Annual Grammy Awards. Kenneth Ehrlich served as executive producer, with Rac Clark as co-executive producer. The production was written by David Wild and Ehrlich and directed by Gregg Gelfand.

Paul McCartney and Ringo Starr, the two surviving members of the band, attended and performed at the concert. McCartney admitted to having some initial hesitation about the project: "What can I say about this evening, it's just amazing [...] At first when I was asked to do the show, I was wondering if it was the right thing to do. Was it seemly to tribute yourself? But I saw a couple of American guys who said to me, 'You don't understand the impact of that appearance on the show on America.' I didn't realize that."

Clips of the Beatles performing on The Ed Sullivan Show were also included in the program, as well as an interview with Paul and Ringo by David Letterman in Studio 50 (Ed Sullivan Theater).

=== Performances ===
Performer(s)	Performed song(s)
Maroon 5	"All My Loving" "Ticket to Ride"
Stevie Wonder	"We Can Work It Out" (performed twice)
Jeff Lynne; Joe Walsh; Dhani Harrison	"Something"
Ed Sheeran	"In My Life"
John Mayer; Keith Urban	"Don't Let Me Down"
Katy Perry	"Yesterday"
Imagine Dragons	"Revolution 1"
Dave Grohl; Jeff Lynne	"Hey Bulldog"
Eurythmics	"The Fool on the Hill"
John Legend; Alicia Keys	"Let It Be"
Brad Paisley; Pharrell Williams	"Here Comes the Sun"
Gary Clark Jr. Dave Grohl; Joe Walsh	"While My Guitar Gently Weeps"
Ringo Starr	"Matchbox" "Boys" "Yellow Submarine"
Paul McCartney	"Magical Mystery Tour" (not broadcast) "Birthday" "Get Back" "I Saw Her Standing There" "Sgt. Pepper's Lonely Hearts Club Band"
Paul McCartney; Ringo Starr	"With a Little Help from My Friends" "Hey Jude" (with ensemble)

=== House band ===
- Don Was – bass, musical director
- Steve Lukather – guitars
- Peter Frampton – guitars
- Rami Jaffee – organ
- Greg Phillinganes – keyboards, piano
- Chris Caswell – keyboards
- Kenny Aronoff – drums
- Lenny Castro – percussion
- Larry Hall – trumpet
- Nick Lane – trombone
- Dylan Hart – horn
- Justin Hageman – horn
- Paul Klintworth – horn
- Annie Bosler – horn
- Larry Williams – saxophone, woodwind
- Kari Kimmel – background vocals
- Judith Hill – background vocals
- Carmel Echols – background vocals

=== Paul McCartney's Band ===
- Rusty Anderson – guitars
- Brian Ray – guitars, bass
- Paul "Wix" Wickens – keyboards
- Abe Laboriel Jr – drums

=== Presenters (in order of appearance) ===
- LL Cool J
- Johnny Depp
- Eric Idle (edited for broadcast)
- Kate Beckinsale
- Anna Kendrick
- Jeff Bridges (edited for broadcast)
- Sean Penn

== See also ==
- Collaborations between ex-Beatles
- The Beatles on The Ed Sullivan Show
- Tributes to the Beatles
