= A Toot and a Snore in '74 =

1992 bootleg album with John Lennon and Paul McCartney

Studio album (bootleg) by John Lennon and Paul McCartney
- Released: 1992
- Recorded: 28 March 1974, Burbank Studios, Los Angeles
- Genre: Rock
- Length: 29:12
- Labels: Mistral Music; MM 9225

A Toot and a Snore in '74 is a bootleg album consisting of the only known recording session in which John Lennon and Paul McCartney played together after the break-up of the Beatles in 1970. First mentioned by Lennon in a 1975 interview, more details were brought to light in May Pang's 1983 book, Loving John, and it gained wider prominence when McCartney made reference to the session in a 1997 interview. Talking with Australian writer Sean Sennett in his Soho office McCartney said the "session was hazy... for a number of reasons". The rare bootleg first appeared in 1992 on the 'Mistral' label.

== Recording history ==
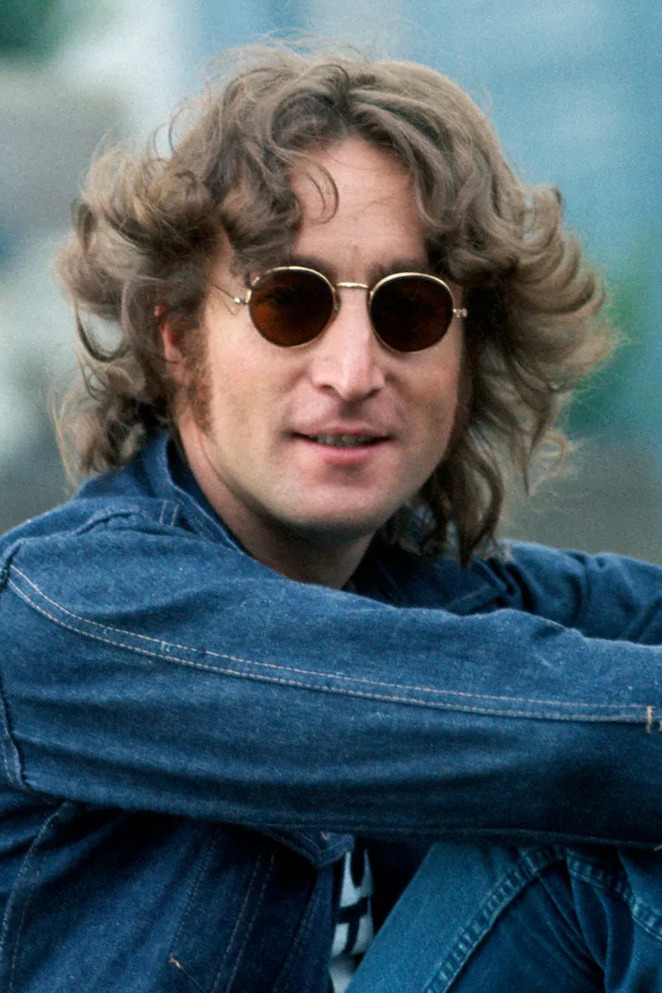
Lennon in a 1974 press kit photo

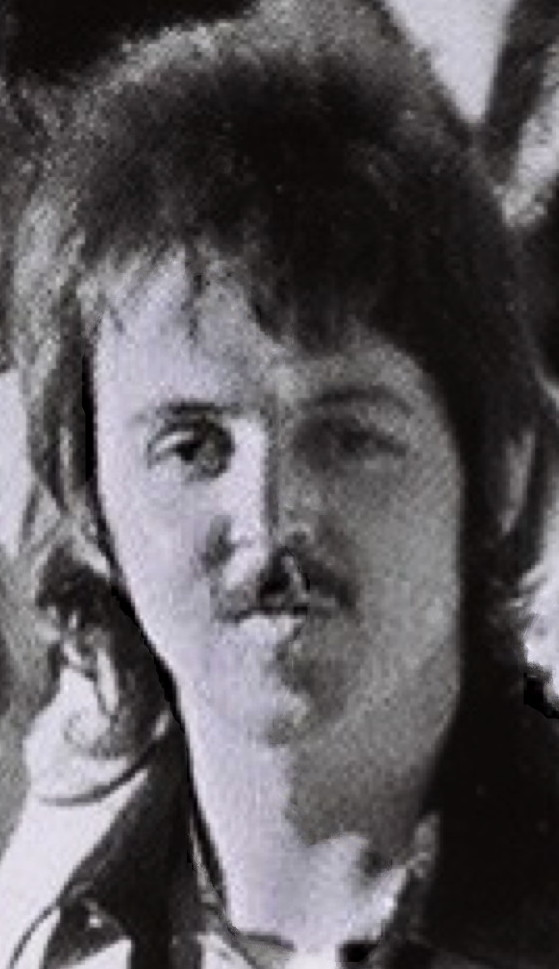
McCartney in April 1974

Lennon was producing Harry Nilsson's album Pussy Cats when Paul and Linda McCartney dropped in after the first night of the sessions, a.k.a. "the Jim Keltner Fan Club Hour", at Burbank Studios on 28 March 1974. They were joined by Nilsson, Stevie Wonder, Jesse Ed Davis, May Pang, Mal Evans, Bobby Keys and producer Ed Freeman for an impromptu jam session.

Lennon was separated from Yoko Ono and living in Los Angeles with Pang in a period of his life popularly referred to as his "lost weekend". Although he and McCartney had not seen each other in three years and had lashed out at each other in the press, according to Pang they resumed their friendship as if nothing had happened. The jam session proved not very productive musically. Lennon sounds to be on cocaine and is heard offering Wonder a snort on the first track, then asking someone to give him a snort on the fifth. This is also the origin of the album title, where John Lennon clearly asks: "You wanna snort, Steve? A toot? It's goin' round". In addition, Lennon seems to be having trouble with his microphone and headphones.

Lennon is on lead vocal and guitar, and McCartney sings harmony and plays Ringo Starr's drums (Starr, who was recording with Nilsson at the time but not present at the session, complained at the next day's recording session that "[McCartney] always messes up my drums!"). Stevie Wonder sings and plays electric piano, Linda McCartney is on organ, Pang plays tambourine, Nilsson provides vocals, Davis is on guitar, Freeman (who was producing Don McLean in the neighboring studio) fills in on bass, and Keys plays saxophone. Keys was questioned a number of times about the session, but could not recall any of it.

It remains the only known instance of Lennon and McCartney playing together after 1970. Aside from informal, special occasions such as weddings, collaborations of more than two ex-Beatles had been rare since the band's 1969–70 split.

== Reception ==
In 2015, Uncut ranked A Toot and a Snore in '74 at number 40 in their list of the 50 best bootlegs. Uncut describe it as a recording of "unspectacular banter and similarly unlegendary music", while Wonder "attempts magnificently to paper over the cracks", and categorise its sound quality as "documentarily satisfactory/quiet/poor". They concluded: "An interesting encounter, but one maybe more romantically memorialised by the snapshot of a moustachioed Macca visiting Lennon at home in LA, taken by Keith Moon's minder, Dougal Butler."

Q's Tom Doyle describes the bootleg as leaking the "shambolic results" of the session, writing that the musicians "proceeded to jam – and to get high." Rock's Backpages similarly described the recording as a jam and commented that its title is "a pretty fair description of many of the other sessions on which the by-now very hard-living Keys also played during this time." Erik Himmelsbach of the same site writes that despite being notable as Lennon and McCartney's final recording together, "the title of a 30-minute bootleg of the jam – A Toot and a Snore – says it all. The music was a mess, but Lennon was apparently a gracious host with the blow: 'Do you want a snort, Stevie, a toot? It's going around,' he's heard on the Toot tape." Jayson Greene of Pitchfork writes that the bootleg title "came from cocaine, and it sounds that way", describing the session as "mythical, and yet the result was atrocious."

Lennon biographer James A. Mitchell notes that despite its later issue as a bootleg, the impromptu performance was not something that would have been officially released, as it consists of "scattered bits and pieces of songs pulled from strained memories amid the unspoken expectations. It was fun, but the time and place weren't feted for anything further." Jimmy Iovine, a witness to the session, commented that McCartney chose to play drums "because he was alert enough to say, 'This is not how the Beatles are getting back together'. He was the one in the room who you could see got it." McCartney reflected in 2007: "I'm afraid it was a rather heady session, shall we say. I don't think it was very good. I mean, that is kinda proof really that [a Beatles reunion] wouldn't necessarily have been great."

== Track listing ==
A Toot and a Snore in '74 track listing
| No. | Title | Writer(s) | Length |
|---|---|---|---|
| 1. | "A Toot and a Snore" | | 0:27 |
| 2. | "Bluesy Jam" | | 2:33 |
| 3. | "Studio Talk" | | 2:40 |
| 4. | "Lucille" | Albert Collins, Richard Penniman | 5:59 |
| 5. | "Nightmares" (Sleep Walk) | Santo & Johnny | 2:38 |
| 6. | "Stand by Me" (Take 1) | Ben E. King | 2:18 |
| 7. | "Stand by Me" (Take 2) | Ben E. King | 3:41 |
| 8. | "Stand by Me" (Take 3) | Ben E. King | 6:04 |
| 9. | "Medley" (Cupid / Chain Gang / Take This Hammer) | Sam Cooke (Cupid & Chain Gang) | 3:15 |
| Total length: | | | 28:59 |

=== Notes ===
1. "A Toot and a Snore" – 0:27
2. "Bluesy Jam" – 2:33
3. "Studio Talk" – 2:40
  - The group plays a few bars of "Little Bitty Pretty One" by Thurston Harris, and John sings the first line but says he can't remember any more
4. "Lucille" – 5:59
5. "Nightmares" – 2:38
  - The group is actually playing "Sleep Walk", the 1959 Santo & Johnny instrumental hit.
6. "Stand by Me" – 2:18
  - Mostly Lennon complaining about the sound in his headphones and reminiscing about how it was better half an hour ago.
7. "Stand by Me" – 3:41
  - Lennon complains about the sound again, saying that it was better two hours ago.
8. "Stand by Me" – 6:04
  - Because of Lennon's complaints, the studio has changed the microphone levels on the recording itself (rather than the performers' headphones), and most of his lead vocals can no longer be heard.
9. Medley – 3:10
  - After the general chaos of the Lennon-led session, Stevie Wonder tries steering the group into the following medley.

== Personnel ==
in alphabetical order:

- Jesse Ed Davis – guitar
- Mal Evans – tambourine
- Ed Freeman – bass
- Bobby Keys – saxophone
- John Lennon – guitar, vocals
- Linda McCartney – organ
- Paul McCartney – drums, vocals
- Harry Nilsson – vocals
- May Pang – tambourine
- Stevie Wonder – electric piano, vocals (mostly on "Cupid")

Linda McCartney and Freeman are not credited on the bootleg's back cover. After the musicians, Mal Evans is credited with "Tea" and Pang with "Sympathy."

== Artwork ==
The album's front cover is based on Revolver, the back cover of Imagine, and the 1979 compilation album The Songs Lennon and McCartney Gave Away.
