= The Beatles on The Ed Sullivan Show =

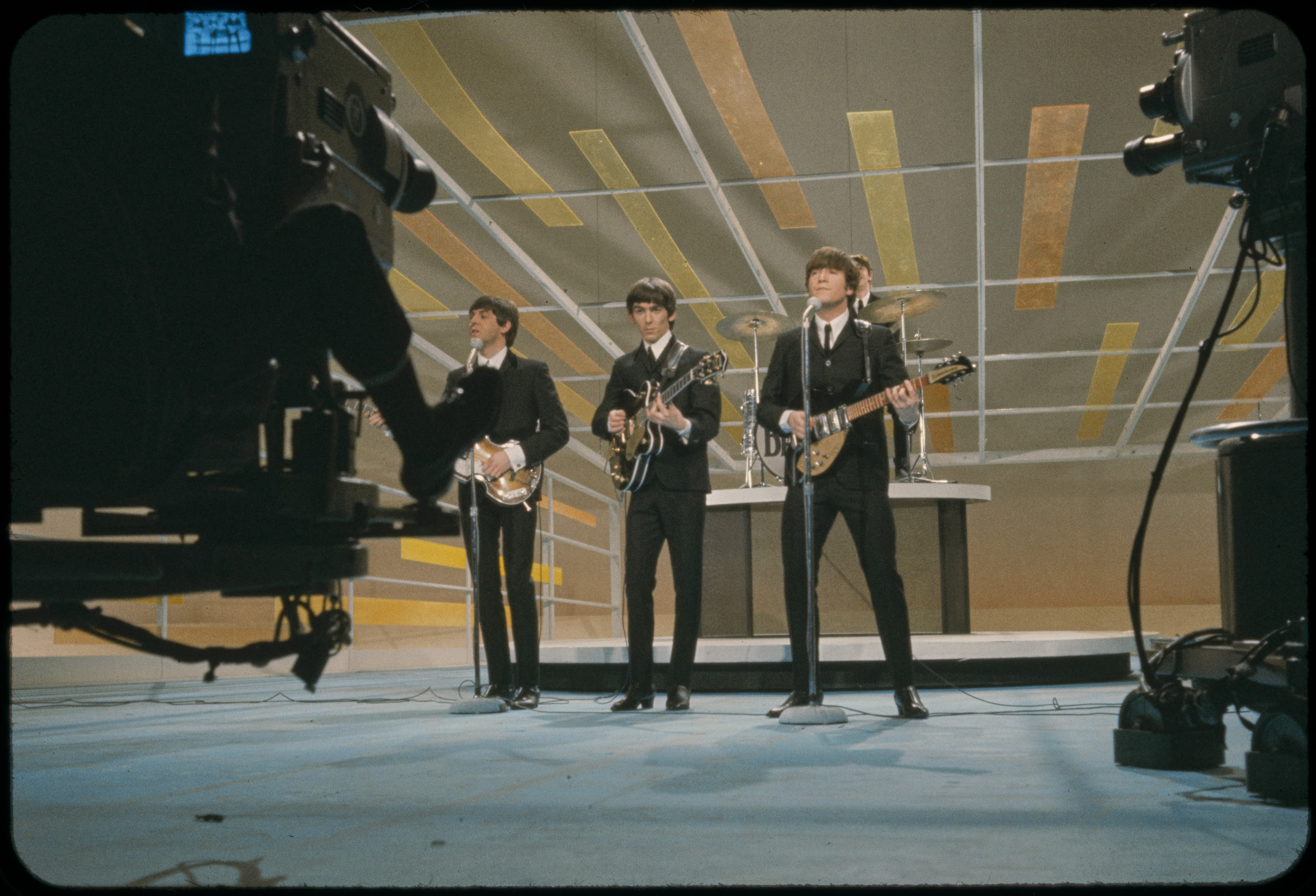
The Beatles performing on The Ed Sullivan Show on February 9, 1964

The Beatles made several appearances on The Ed Sullivan Show, including three in February 1964 that were among their first appearances in front of an American audience. Their first appearance, on February 9, was seen by over 73 million viewers and came to be regarded as a cultural watershed that launched American Beatlemania—as well as the wider British Invasion of American pop music—and inspired many young viewers to become rock musicians. The band also made another appearance during their 1965 U.S. tour.

== Background ==
American composer and champion of music Bernard Herrmann recalled in 1970 that around 1962, he had returned to the U.S. from a conducting job in Liverpool with early Parlophone records of the Beatles that he received from the band. According to him, the Beatles, at the time struggling to get noticed and recorded by major companies, were interested in an appearance on U.S. television programmes such as the Ed Sullivan Show and in making recordings with American record companies, in exchange for a pay of about a thousand dollars. Herrmann claimed to have unsuccessfully attempted to persuade the executives of Universal Records and Columbia Broadcasting System that the Beatles had something novel to offer.

The Beatles' fortunes changed after Ed Sullivan Show talent booker Jack Babb saw the band twice in concert in the UK the following year, after being invited by Peter Prichard, a London talent agent who was also a friend of Beatles manager Brian Epstein. Babb was initially uninterested in booking the group for the show, as British musical acts at that time experienced little commercial success in the U.S. Then, on October 31, Ed Sullivan was at London's Heathrow Airport and saw a crowd of 1,500 fans await the Beatles' return from a tour of Sweden. Struck by the crowds, Sullivan became interested in booking the Beatles for his show, and Prichard notified Epstein. Another influence was a CBS Evening News segment on the group; Walter Cronkite recalled, "The minute I was off the air, Ed was on the phone: 'How do I get a hold of those people? What do you know about them?' I told him everything I knew, which was very little. I said, 'Get in touch with our London bureau.'"

Epstein flew to New York on November 5 to promote another one of his acts, Billy J. Kramer and the Dakotas. Six days later, Epstein and Sullivan met at the Hotel Delmonico and agreed to have the Beatles perform three shows—two live and one taped. The Beatles ended up earning $2,400 ($19,014 in 2025 dollars) for each of the three shows.

The Beatles began to receive attention in the mainstream American press and radio play in November and December 1963. On 18 November 1963, the Huntley-Brinkley Report news program aired a somewhat derogatory segment of the group while, on 3 January, a more positive report was done for The Jack Paar Program, both on NBC. Due to rapidly growing listener demand, the band's first single on Capitol Records, "I Want to Hold Your Hand" was rush-released in late December, three weeks ahead of schedule. Capitol had hoped that the single's original release date, on January 16, 1964, would allow the Beatles' Sullivan Show appearances in early February to bolster sales. Instead, the song reached the top of the Billboard Hot 100 chart on January 25, 1964, just before the Beatles were due to arrive in the U.S.

== Appearances ==
=== 1964 ===
The Beatles flew into the recently renamed John F. Kennedy International Airport in New York on February 7 to a waiting crowd of 5,000 fans, and after a press conference arrived at the Plaza Hotel in Manhattan.

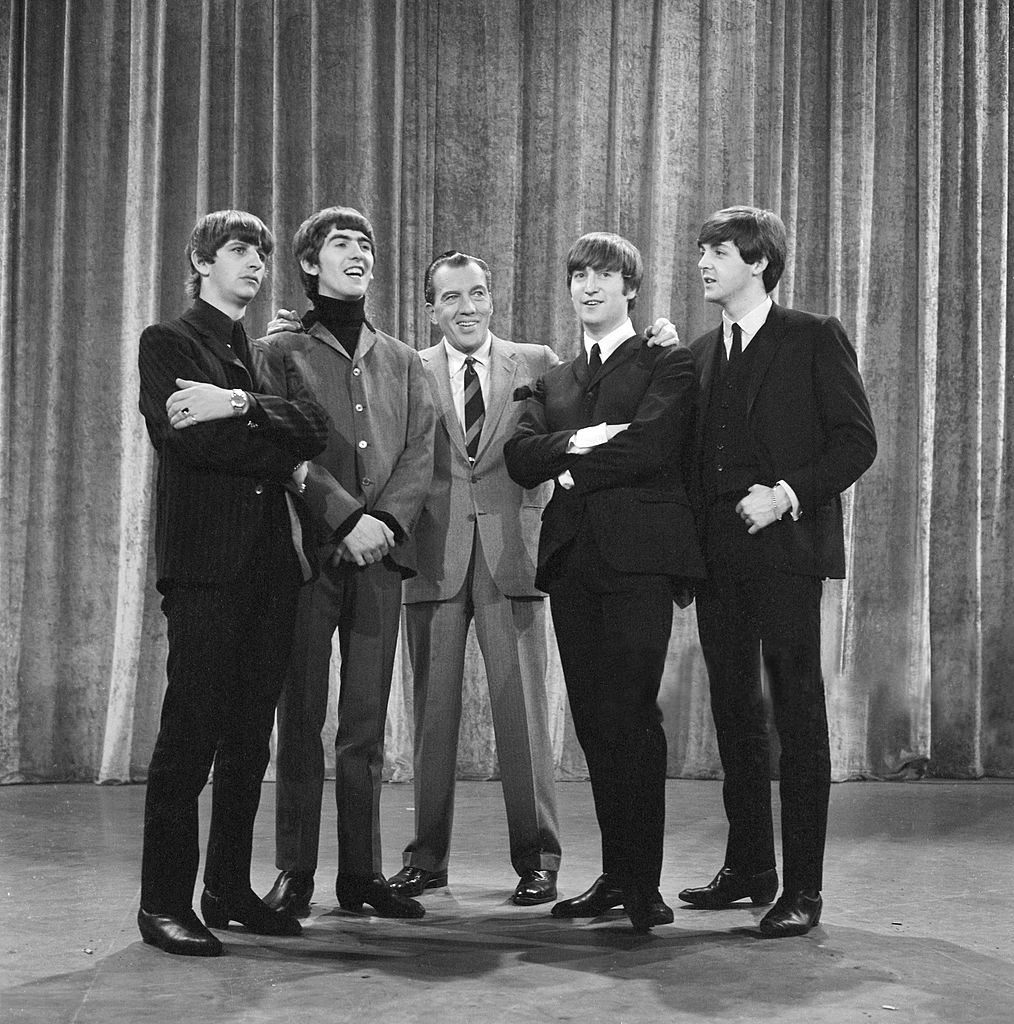
The Beatles with Ed Sullivan (February 8, 1964)

During the February 8 rehearsals for their first performance, lead guitarist George Harrison was confined to the hotel while recovering from strep throat; Beatles road manager Neil Aspinall and an Ed Sullivan Show staffer took turns standing in for Harrison during the rehearsals.

==== February 9 ====
CBS saw huge anticipation for the Beatles' first appearance, with 50,000 ticket requests for the 728-seat Studio 50 (now known as the Ed Sullivan Theater) where the band was to perform, far surpassing the 7,000 requested for Elvis Presley's 1956 debut. Among those in attendance were Richard Nixon's daughters, Julie and Tricia, who had been invited by NBC host Jack Paar's daughter, Randy. Backstage before the show, freshly minted Olympic gold-medal speed skater Terry McDermott, a part-time barber, posed for photographs with the band in which he pretended to cut Paul McCartney's hair as the other band members and Sullivan looked on with mock horror.

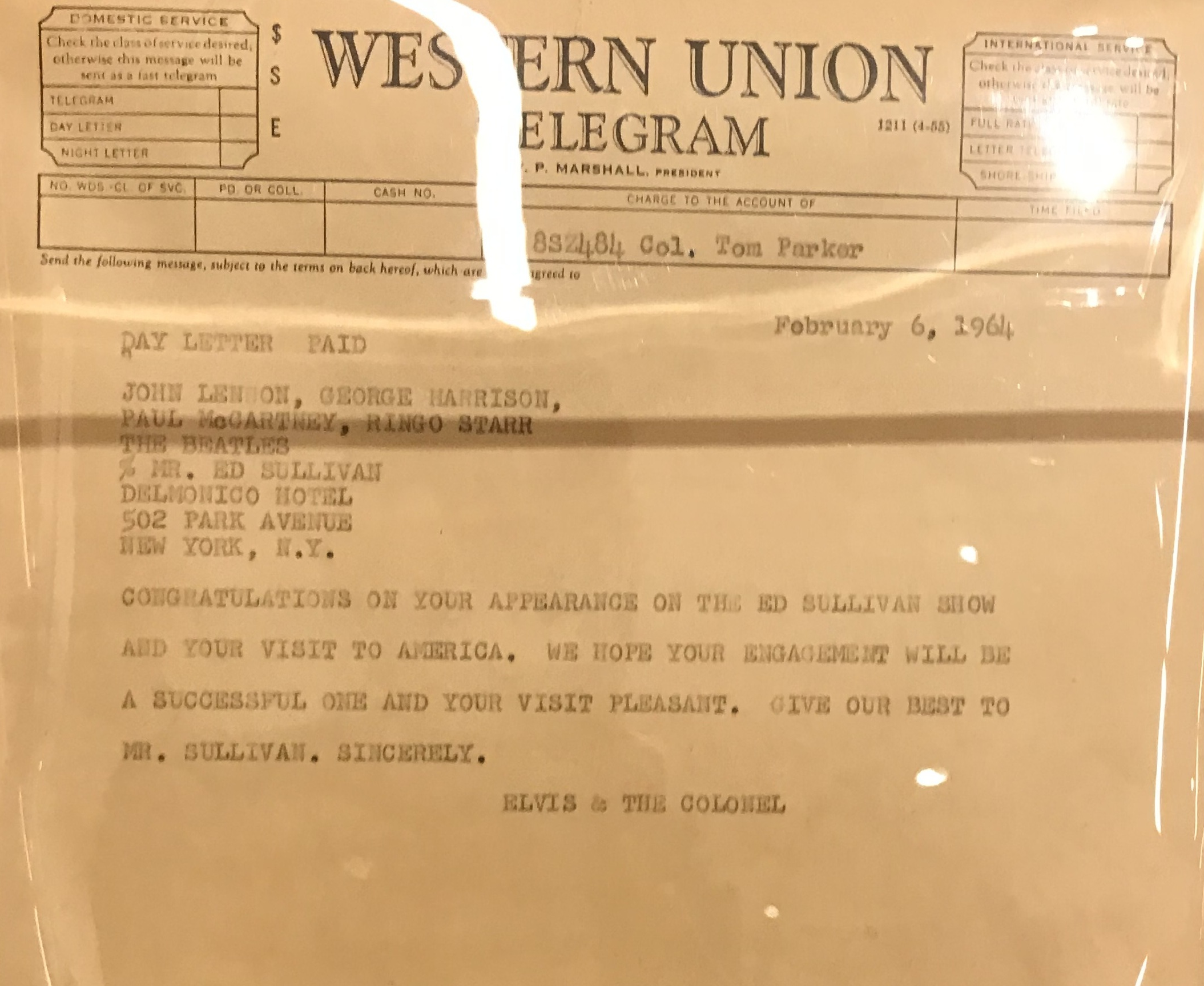
Telegram sent by Elvis Presley and Colonel Tom Parker to the Beatles

Sullivan began the show by telling the audience that Elvis Presley and his manager, Colonel Tom Parker, had sent the Beatles a telegram wishing them success in America (though it was reported later that Parker sent the telegram without Presley's knowledge). Sullivan then introduced the Beatles, who opened by performing "All My Loving"; "Till There Was You", which featured the names of the group members superimposed on closeup shots, including the famous "SORRY GIRLS, HE'S MARRIED" caption on John Lennon; and "She Loves You". The act that followed the Beatles in the broadcast, magician Fred Kaps, was pre-recorded in order to allow time for an elaborate set change. The group returned later in the program to perform "I Saw Her Standing There" and "I Want to Hold Your Hand".

The appearance on February 9 is considered a milestone in American pop culture, and furthermore the beginning of the British Invasion in music. The broadcast drew more than 73 million viewers, a record for U.S. television at the time (broken three years later by the series finale of The Fugitive). The broadcast drew a rating of 45.3 and a 60 share, and was Sullivan's first time in seven years that he topped the nightly ratings. A typical Sullivan broadcast at the time drew about 21 million viewers.

The Beatles had mixed reactions to the production value of their performance, with Paul McCartney later remarking that Lennon's microphone volume was too low.

==== February 16 ====
After a February 11 concert in Washington, D.C.'s Washington Coliseum and two February 12 shows in New York's Carnegie Hall, the Beatles flew to Miami Beach on February 13, where Cassius Clay (later known as Muhammad Ali) was in training for his first title bout with Sonny Liston (on February 18, the Beatles would eventually pose for publicity photographs with Clay in a boxing gym). The Beatles held rehearsals on February 14 and 15. The band stayed in the Hotel Deauville, which was also the broadcast location for the show. The Beatles rehearsed in the hotel's basement.

On the evening of the television show, a crush of people nearly prevented the band from making it onstage. A wedge of policemen was needed and the band began playing "She Loves You" only seconds after reaching their instruments. They continued with "This Boy" and "All My Loving", then returned later to close the show with "I Saw Her Standing There", "From Me to You", and "I Want to Hold Your Hand".

The audience for this show was about 70 million, nearly equaling the prior week's performance.

John Lennon played a new Rickenbacker 325 guitar for this show after company executives noticed the poor condition of Lennon's original 325 during the February 9 show and directed that Lennon be given a replacement. Lennon continued to use the "Miami" 325 as his main stage instrument for the rest of the group's tours in 1964 and 1965.

==== February 23 ====
The Beatles' third appearance aired on February 23, though it had actually been taped on February 9, before their first live performance. They followed Ed Sullivan's intro with "Twist and Shout" and "Please Please Me" and closed the show once again with "I Want to Hold Your Hand".

==== May 24 ====
On this occasion, the show aired an interview with the band and a taped performance of "You Can't Do That".

=== 1965 ===
The Beatles were taped live for the final time on August 14, 1965. The performance was broadcast September 12, 1965, and earned Sullivan a 60-percent share of the nighttime audience. This time they followed three acts before coming out to perform "I Feel Fine", "I'm Down", and "Act Naturally" and then closed the show with "Ticket to Ride", "Yesterday", and "Help!"

=== Later years ===
Although the Beatles rarely performed live after 1966, the group provided filmed promotional clips of songs to air exclusively on Sullivan's program over the next few years, including videos of both "Paperback Writer" and "Rain" from June 1966 and three clips from 1967, including "Penny Lane", "Strawberry Fields Forever", and "Hello, Goodbye".

The Beatles' last appearances on The Ed Sullivan Show came on March 1, 1970, when they released promotional videos for "Two of Us" and "Let It Be".

McCartney stated in a 1990 press conference that he met Sullivan again in the early 1970s, though Sullivan appeared to have no memory of McCartney or the Beatles appearing on his show. In a 2012 interview, comedian Joan Rivers recounted that Sullivan was suffering from dementia by this time in his life. Sullivan died in 1974.

== Legacy and impact ==
=== Contemporary reception ===
The Beatles' Sullivan Show appearances catalyzed a run of extraordinary commercial success in the U.S.; the Beatles sold 2.5 million records in the country in the month after the first appearance and by early April became the first act to hold all top 5 spots in the Billboard Hot 100 chart.

The majority of American cultural critics responded to the Beatles' performances by expressing bemusement at the unusually strong audience reactions or by mocking the Beatles' haircuts, with only a few focusing on the Beatles' musical performances and talents. Reverend Billy Graham, who tuned in to the first show despite his customary avoidance of TV on Sunday, dismissed Beatlemania as a "passing phase".

=== Historical and cultural legacy ===
In retrospect, critics have recognized the Beatles' appearances, particularly the February 9 showing, as a watershed cultural moment for Americans in the 1960s. In 1994, the Museum of Television and Radio reported that the February 9 performance was one of the museum's most-requested TV clips. Ron Simon, the museum's curator for television, remarked that "It was tremendously significant. The whole idea of the cross-cultural phenomenon, the whole idea of Beatlemania, it all came together here." Commentators have also attributed the Beatles' Sullivan Show appearances and early Beatlemania for helping to heal the national trauma from the assassination of John F. Kennedy in November 1963.

Numerous musical artists have cited the Beatles' Ed Sullivan Show appearances as their inspiration for becoming musicians, including Billy Joel, Tom Petty, Gene Simmons, Joe Perry, Nancy Wilson, Kenny Loggins, Mark Mothersbaugh, Bruce Springsteen, Richie Sambora, Will Lee, GG Allin, and Chris Bell. Wilson recalled in 2007, "The lightning bolt came out of the heavens and struck [my sister] Ann and me the first time we saw the Beatles on The Ed Sullivan Show. ... There'd been so much anticipation and hype about the Beatles that it was a huge event, like the lunar landing: that was the moment Ann and I heard the call to become rock musicians." Chrissie Hynde of the Pretenders reflected, "I remember exactly where I was sitting. It was amazing. It was like the axis shifted. ... It was kind of like an alien invasion.

Paul McCartney has performed at the Ed Sullivan Theater three times since leaving the Beatles—once in 1992, once in 2009 on the building's exterior marquee, and on The Late Show's final episode in 2026.

==== Tributes ====
CBS continues to use the Ed Sullivan Theater for TV productions. In February 2014, for the 50th anniversary of the Beatles' first appearance, Paul McCartney and Ringo Starr returned to the theater for a joint interview with David Letterman. On February 9, the 50th anniversary of the Beatles' first Ed Sullivan performance, CBS News hosted a roundtable discussion at the theater. Anthony Mason moderated the panel, which consisted of Pattie Boyd, Neil Innes, Mick Jones, Tad Kubler, John Oates, Peter Asher, Nile Rodgers, and Julie Taymor.

In the 1996 comedy-drama That Thing You Do!, when fictional 1960s band the Wonders appear on The Hollywood Television Showcase, one member is captioned "Careful, girls, he's engaged!"

The music video of Outkast's 2003 hit single "Hey Ya!" mimicked the Beatles' Ed Sullivan Show appearance—though the setting is reversed, with OutKast playing the fictional American band the Love Below in front of a British audience.

On May 15, 2019, South Korean boy band BTS paid homage to the Beatles' first Ed Sullivan Show appearance by filming two black-and-white segments in Beatles-style suits for The Late Show with Stephen Colbert at the Ed Sullivan Theater. The segments—a cold open and a musical performance of "Boy with Luv"—also featured Colbert dressing up as Sullivan.

On November 11, 2023, American indie rock band Boygenius performed their songs "Not Strong Enough" and "Satanist" on Saturday Night Live with a set built to look like the Ed Sullivan Show's. The band also dressed in suits and featured a Beatles-esque Ludwig drum kit with a kick drum mirroring the Beatles' own logo.

The 2025 Marvel Cinematic Universe film The Fantastic Four: First Steps, which is set in a retro-futuristic 1960s inspired world, includes a shot of the titular superhero team in a setting with giant arrows that resembles the stage from the Beatles' first performance on The Ed Sullivan Show.

== See also ==
- Outline of the Beatles
- The Beatles timeline
- Beatlemania
- I Wanna Hold Your Hand – a 1978 film about teenage girls who attempt see the Beatles' first Ed Sullivan Show appearance
- List of the Beatles' live performances
- List of most watched television broadcasts in the United States
- The Beatles: The First U.S. Visit – a documentary on the Beatles' February 1964 shows in the U.S.
- The Night That Changed America: A Grammy Salute to the Beatles – a 2014 Grammy tribute on the 50th anniversary of the first Ed Sullivan appearance
- Beatles '64
