= George Lyward =

British educationist and psychotherapist

George Aubrey Lyward OBE (13 January 1894 – 22 June 1973) was a British educationalist and psychotherapist who founded and led Finchden Manor, a "community for delinquent, disturbed or disturbing boys" in Tenterden, Kent, UK.

== Early life and education ==
Lyward grew up in the Clapham Junction area of south London. His father was a clerk and an opera singer among other endeavours, but left home while Lyward was very young. His mother taught in the Infant’s Department at St Stephen’s School in Westminster (later Burdett-Coutts School). He had three sisters. A serious bout of polio at age 7 left him with a weakened leg. He won a scholarship to Emanuel School in Battersea, and there became a prefect, Head of House, and a sergeant in the Officers' Training Corps. As a prefect, he found that, despite his physical frailty, he had no difficulty when asked to keep order with a group known as the ‘toughs’. This experience made him aware of his ability to get on with ‘difficult’ boys. Even with the weakness in his leg, he went on to become a qualified and well-regarded rugby coach, and was a member of the London Society of Rugby Referees.

After leaving school he taught in two prep schools and at Kingston Grammar School and then returned to Emanuel as a master.

During WWI, Lyward was rejected for service because of his weakened leg, but he served for several years in the Territorials with the OTC.

In 1917 he was given two scholarships that allowed him to attend Cambridge. His plan to become a parson allowed some financial help from Church of England funds. Through his fine bass/baritone voice he was also awarded a choral scholarship to St John’s College. In order to supplement his modest scholarship funds he was a house tutor at The Perse School in Cambridge. He took a history degree, and in 1920 undertook clerical training at Bishop's College, Cheshunt. However, he abandoned this path two weeks before his planned ordination.

He taught again at Emanuel, then in 1923 moved to Trinity College, Glenalmond in Scotland to work with the sixth form, developing his ideas about teaching this age group. In 1928 a broken engagement led to a breakdown and treatment by Hugh Crichton-Miller, who along with John Rawlings Rees later asked Lyward to help with some of their patients.

== Finchden Manor ==
Lyward originally began working with a number of patients at Guildables farm, Edenbridge, Kent in 1930. By 1935 he moved the growing group to larger premises at Finchden Manor, Kent. During WW2, when Finchden Manor was requisitioned by the army, the community relocated to Pipe Aston near Ludlow, Shropshire, and then to Marrington Hall, Chirbury, Shropshire. After the war the community returned to Finchden Manor. Lyward continued to work there until his death in 1973.

Finchden Manor is a Grade II* listed building on the outskirts of Tenterden, Kent. It is a large 16th century timber-framed house with subsequent additions. Sir Thomas More, when Lord Chancellor of England, was reported to have visited the house. It was used in the 19th century as a Benedictine priory. After Lyward's community closed, Finchden Manor was converted to a set of private houses. The stable block and two sets of gate piers along with a garden wall are Grade II listed.

== Therapeutic approach ==
When Michael Burn, who wrote a book about Finchden Manor, first met Lyward he said 'I had a feeling of relief. He looked like none of the types I had dreaded finding … not a Presence, or Grand Old Man … He was of middle height and looked frail. He had a slightly abstracted air, and held his right hand over his heart, as if taking an oath or apologising for a hiccup.'

A former Finchden boy recalls his initial interview with Lyward:

'He had a playful manner which threw you from the serious to the teasing and back again faster than I could keep up with. I was still answering the serious question when he was apparently making a joke about it. Yet I noticed he never lost the sense of direction, even though I felt I was being pulled around all the points of the compass in random order. He was getting his answers while I was still lost, giddy, and not sure what we had been talking about.'

Lyward's style was conversational, mercurial, improvisational, and at times contradictory. His usual medium was lively conversation, 1-1 or with a group. He could disarm, reassure, provoke, surprise, amuse and attack. Despite the boldness of his therapeutic approach, Lyward was basically a shy man, with a lifelong insecurity that gave him a chameleon-like quality designed to gain the support and approval of whomever he was with One colleague's view was that Finchden provided a sheltered environment for Lyward, where his position protected him from those outside pressures with which he was unable to cope, while at the same time allowing him to be useful in helping those who lived there.

Lyward said that his educational and therapeutic career began 'when I first stood in front of a group of children, and the thought came to me like a blow, these are people – we are all people together in a room - that is the most important thing about this situation … Nothing could separate us, we were members one of another.'

Lyward said his approach has been was poetic rather than medical. He said that only a poet could understand Finchden and make sense of it. And, a fellow educationalist later added, only a poet could have run it.

Lyward never wrote a comprehensive account of his methods. From his occasional writings and that of a number of colleagues some of the fundamental elements of his approach can be described.

According to one of his senior staff, Lyward had a talent for 'creative personal relationships'. On a first meeting he could put an anxious, self-protective or aggressive person at their ease, 'disarming' them and making them feel secure and accepted just as themselves . One psychiatrist felt that Lyward's major contribution was to recognise that the task of the therapist and teacher is 'to engage the other … in such a way that the need for masks diminishes and he person can respond fully from his "center".' Part of the experience of being at Finchden was to have the individual's sense of trust and security widened from Lyward to include one or more of the staff, and eventually to the community as a whole.

Finchden provided respite, with no pressures and as much time as was needed for recovery and regrowth. Lyward's interviews with a boy would have no time limit. They could take hours if necessary.

The Finchden experience for most involved being allowed to regress and then to grow again through a much more secure and creative boyhood in a process Lyward sometimes called 'reweaning'. When appearing for a boy in court, and being asked by the Judge what sort of a place Finchden was, Lyward said 'I think I would call it a nursery, my Lord.'

Lyward often spoke of the 'depth' of the group experience at Finchden, and of how living at that depth is what provided the primary therapeutic benefit. The precise meaning of this word is elusive. No doubt, aspects of the Finchden experience which contributed to a deeper group experience were the lack of labels and no rules with accompanying sanctions. Lyward spoke of four kinds of group life, of increasing depth : guests at a hotel, a group governed by rules and sanctions, a group characterised by active involvement, and lastly, in St Paul’s phrase, a group which produced ‘membership one of another’. This phrase, a favourite of Lyward's, suggests a meeting with each other simply as people, with a mutual regard and respect.

One statement that Lyward made that perhaps comes closest to defining what he meant by this depth of group life was: 'The emerging discipline of non-contractual living together without labels, formalized sanctions, or superficial fairness makes for play and recognition and for awareness and the genuine 'please' and 'thank you' that reveal non-face-saving health.'

=== No rules ===
Lyward would tell visitors that Finchden Manor operated without rules, because rules implied sanctions, which would impede the therapeutic flow of life in the community and would not be practical in any case. If asked what was the structure of the day, he would sometimes reply 'Four meals a day plus cocoa.'

At other times Lyward would say that the only rule at Finchden Manor was no pairing off, which could have the effect of insulating the pair from the rest of the community.

Lyward tried to avoid labelling of all sorts, even admitting that he was not happy that the office at Finchden was so named. In a lecture on this subject he said 'I know there must be limits to this unlabelling. I know that many people need to use labels. I know there are children and adolescents who are so used to them that they must keep them for a while. But my purpose tonight is to hint at the opportunities which lie open where the labelling is reduced to a minimum, where you move about as people with people, not merely masters and pupils, or doctors and patients, and so on.'

=== Regular activities ===
If Finchden Manor did not have written rules it did have traditions and expectations.

All the household chores, including cooking for the whole contingent of 50-70, were done by the boys. The skills were passed on from the older boys to the newer ones. Staff drew up a chores rota each week, and one of the staff had the task to keep a special eye on the kitchen. The cooking tended to be of a surprisingly high order. For special occasions the kitchen was busy until late the night before, to provide an array of cakes, petit fours, eclairs and brandy snaps, all made from scratch. It was common for visitors to be sceptical that this bunch of unprepossessing looking boys had produced such elegant baking and pastries.

There were some activities that happened at different times of the year. An Easter treasure hunt took place using staff cars full of boys, chasing around the countryside, the clues usually devised by one or two of the older boys with staff assistance. The weekend of August Bank Holiday brought Old Boys' Day, when former Finchden residents returned. Those with families brought them along. A cricket match took place – Old Boys versus the current boys. A roast meal with all the trimmings was held in the hall. Many of the boys tended to stay on over Christmas, and a sumptuous meal was held in the hall, which was elaborately decorated for the occasion on a different theme each year – a Viking Hall, a fairground, a zoo, a Dickensian street scene.

Ambitious plays were put on. Partly because the boys and staff involved had time through the day to work on a production, the standard of the acting and the set tended to be quite high. The audience was composed of local people, professional associates, and others who had become attached to Finchden Manor over the years. Some of the plays put on were Men in Shadow (which was taken on a small tour), One Way Pendulum, My Three Angels, The Tempest, The Thirteen Clocks, Sweeney Todd, Oh What a Lovely War, and a play written by Lyward some years before. After Lyward died in 1973, and Finchden Manor was in the process of winding down, a rock musical, The Holy Grail, was written and performed by boys and staff, which reflected some of their preoccupations and emotions at that time.

If Lyward called for a 'Command Performance' the boys were challenged to put together a variety show with a few hours' or one day's notice, consisting of skits, recitals and musical numbers.

Dances were held, with local girls being sent formal invitations. A transformative decoration of the hall was undertaken for this, on a different theme for each dance. Scottish country dancing was an important feature. The dance events provided another occasion to produce an elaborate range of cakes and pastries.

The boys stayed in a variety of small and large rooms in the main building and adjacent buildings in the grounds. Every few months a room change would take place with everyone reallocated by staff to a new room and new roommates.

Although Lyward was keen to emphasise that Finchden Manor was not a school, some studying for external exams did happen, when Lyward and the staff thought it was at the right time for an individual boy. The teaching was provided by appropriate staff members.

From time to time the whole community was 'gated' and was not expected to leave the premises for a period of time. This might be in reaction to some trouble caused by Finchden boys when off the premises, but more commonly by Lyward's sense that the community was losing cohesion because of too much coming and going and external involvements.

=== Sessions ===
When Lyward felt that a particular issue had arisen that required the attention of the whole community he would call a 'session' which all boys and staff attended. This was not a discussion but more like a performance where boys (and staff) were the orchestra and Lyward the conductor. The start would normally be very low-key: Lyward talking about a philosophical idea (e.g. The One and the Many), a popular saying (e.g. 'You can’t have it both ways'), something a boy had recently said to him (e.g. 'What’s wrong with being self-indulgent?'), or a quote from a poem. Lyward would expand on the theme and develop it, tossing it around to various members of the group to have their reactions and thoughts. Most sessions contained at least one moment of high drama, often with an individual or a group being singled out for falling below what was expected of them. Angry confrontations could happen, or tears. Following on from a session there was usually some sort of event that involved everyone, such as a thorough sprucing up of the rooms and buildings, or a command performance.

=== The value of unpredictability ===
One feature of life at Finchden Manor was its unpredictability. In the words of one of his staff '[Lyward] saw that the loosening up of compulsive patterns and reactions could be helped by paradoxical treatment which surprised, even shocked, and forced the boy to ask himself questions. Whereas on arrival a boy knew what reaction to expect to his own rebellious and anti-social behaviour, he would be startled and bewildered by what some have called 'paradoxical' reactions, so unexpected as to disturb quite deeply the fixed patterns formerly ingrained.'

Related to this was a lack of concern about 'fairness'. A friend and colleague said, 'There has been much misunderstanding about George Lyward's emphasis on the value of unfairness in fostering creative educational situations … The interesting thing is that though this creates a degree of uncertainty or even shock, it has not resulted in envy or resentment because there has always been a sense of security at a deeper level. Fairness is sometimes associated with certain kinds of routine, and routine for G.A.L. was a means rather than an end in itself.'

=== Stern love ===
Lyward was known to the boys as The Chief. He could be gentle and encouraging with a frightened patient, but his anger could nevertheless on occasion be quite terrifying. Lyward called his approach Stern Love. A colleague once teased him that this was like talking about 'black snow'. It did not take long for a new boy or staff member, or sometimes even a visitor, to encounter the stern aspect of Lyward's approach. The fact that he was expert at switching his anger on and off as the occasion demanded did not detract from its effect. Of this he said 'I take a breath as it were and decide to let fly. This is, I suppose, the surgical side of Finchden Manor.'

A former Finchden boy wrote: 'We had suspected for some while that much of the Chief's anger was put on for the occasion and was therefore, in a sense, synthetic. Eventually, when one of us dared to tackle him on the subject, we received a very useful answer. "Yes", he agreed, "A lot of my anger is not as real as it seems, but then a lot of it is real. Make no mistake about that. However, it makes no difference to you which it is. If you think you can ever laugh it off, or ignore my anger, because you imagine it is not real, then you will discover it will become real for you." ' He told a psychiatrist who was a regular visitor 'It is the fear of my anger that keeps Finchden going', and argued that anger could be important for 'demonstrating commitment and caring to boys who could recognize no other expression of involvement and concern.' Lyward believed that 'these difficult boys had to know that there was a kind of ruthlessness itself part of the passionate caring.'

== Other activities ==
Lyward was for many years the Chairman of the Home and School Council of Great Britain, and editor of its magazine. He was also Vice President of the English New Education Fellowship.

He was External Examiner for the Special Education Course at Redlands College, Bristol.

He was much in demand as a lecturer to training colleges and educational and social work audiences at Oxford, London, Durham and elsewhere. Shortly before his death he was invited to give an address at Westminster Abbey.

== Personal life ==
Lyward’s psychological crisis in 1928 was precipitated by the breaking off of an engagement to marry. After his recovery, he was on a seaside holiday with a friend when, in his words, ‘I saw a group having tea outdoors … A young girl with wonderful copper coloured hair was the person my eyes had lit on … I said to my friend “There is my wife” ‘. This was Sarah (Sadie) Horn, who at the time was studying sculpture.

They married in 1931 and their son John was born in 1933. Sadie was a constant support in the background for Lyward, until her untimely death at the age of 55, in 1967.

Music was always an important part of Lyward’s life. He played the piano every day. A great deal of music-making went on at Finchden Manor. One former Finchden boy observed, ‘Most of us dropped the interest which we had come with, found a wider range of new ones, and only rarely returned to that first interest. When we did, it was for different reasons. The only exception to this principle seemed to be music. Anybody who arrived with a musical skill went on from strength to strength.’

== Legacy ==
As Finchden Manor’s reputation grew, many teaching and social work students were sent on placements as part of their course, or came in groups on day visits to meet with Lyward.

Mr Lyward’s Answer was published in 1956, written by the writer, poet and former commando Michael Burn, who lived for some time as a member of the community at Finchden Manor in order to research the book. Burn said of Lyward that he was '… stern, forbearing, courteous, light of touch; one of life's beloved teachers; one of the life-givers.' He also said that his own book was just '… an introduction to Mr Lyward's work, about which no one can write thoroughly except himself.' The publication of the book raised awareness of Lyward's work in the UK and also the United States.

A radio documentary, Learning to Live, about Finchden Manor by David Dunhill was broadcast on Radio 4 in 1971.

Lyward died in 1973. Over the next two years, extensive efforts were made by the staff to find a way forward in much-altered times, but the decision was eventually made to close, after ensuring that the remaining boys all had satisfactory arrangements for moving on.

The New Era, journal of the World Educational Fellowship, published a memorial issue in 1974 about the life and work of George Lyward.

Lyward featured in the BBC Radio 4 series Great Lives in May 2012, nominated by singer/songwriter Tom Robinson. Robinson had attended Finchden Manor after a suicide attempt at the age of 16, and said that Lyward had saved his life.

Other former residents of Finchden Manor include Alexis Korner, Francis Lickerish, Robert John Godfrey, Matthew Collings and Danny Kustow. Sydney Hopkins, author, as 'Fynn', of Mister God, This Is Anna and its two sequels, was referred to Finchden Manor as a young man and was for many years afterwards a member of staff there.

Unlike his contemporary A. S. Neill, Lyward left behind no books of his own setting out his philosophy and methods. Towards the end of his life, he worked with a research assistant who came to Finchden Manor to help him complete an autobiography and a book about his approach to therapy, but neither of these was completed. The last draft of his autobiography was published in 2009. An educationalist has written Valuing and Educating Young People – Stern Love the Lyward Way about his own methods, which were inspired by Lyward. One of Lyward's staff who had previously been a boy at Finchden Manor published an extensive account of his experiences there, in both of these roles, in A Finchden Experience.
