= Francis Lickerish =

British composer, guitarist, and lutenist

John Francis Lickerish, known professionally as Francis Lickerish (born 11 April 1954, in Cambridge), is a British composer, guitarist and lutenist, and founding member of British art-rock band The Enid.

Lickerish was a member of The Enid from its creation in 1974 until 1980, and appears on their first four studio albums and the two 'Live at Hammersmith' albums. He is an alumnus of Finchden Manor, as are fellow Enid founders Robert John Godfrey and Stephen Stewart.

Lickerish appears uncredited as the session bass guitarist on the Kim Wilde song "Kids in America".

After leaving The Enid he graduated from Sheffield Hallam University, later pursuing a career in counselling, and is a respected professional in the fields of adult addiction and family services, working at Clouds House, The Priory and Capio Nightingale Hospital.

After a 20-year absence from the music industry, he formed a new band Secret Green, in 2006, who released their first album 'To Wake The King' in May 2009.

Lickerish is married with three children and lives in Dorset, England.

== Discography ==
=== Studio albums ===
- The Enid - In the Region of the Summer Stars (1976) (BUK BULP 2014)
- The Enid - Aerie Faerie Nonsense (1977) (EMI International INS 3012)
- The Enid - Touch Me (1978) (Pye NSPH 18593)
- The Enid - Six Pieces (1979) (Pye NH 116)
- Secret Green - To Wake The King (2009) (Holyground HG137)
- Francis Lickerish - Far and Forgot - From the Lost Lands (2012) (self-released SG101)

=== Live albums ===
- The Enid - Live at Hammersmith (Vol 1) (Recorded 1979) (1984) (ENID 1)
- The Enid - Live at Hammersmith (Vol 2) (Recorded 1979) (1984) (ENID 2)

== Sources ==
- Official website of Francis Lickerish
- Capio House
- Forgotten Sons - A History of The Enid
- Discography
