= Why (Yoko Ono song) =

Song by Yoko Ono

Single by Yoko Ono & Plastic Ono Band

from the album Yoko Ono/Plastic Ono Band
- A-side: "Mother" (John Lennon & Plastic Ono Band)
- Released: December 28, 1970 (US only)
- Recorded: 1970
- Studio: Abbey Road Studios, London
- Genre: Proto-punk
- Length: 5:30
- Label: Apple
- Songwriter: Yoko Ono
- Producers: John Lennon; Yoko Ono

"Why" is a song written by Yoko Ono that was first released on her 1970 Yoko Ono/Plastic Ono Band album. In the U.S. it was also released as the B-side of John Lennon's "Mother" single, taken from his John Lennon/Plastic Ono Band album.

== Lyrics and music ==
Beatle biographer John Blaney described the song as "a raucous conflation of avant-gardism and rock 'n' roll". The Atlantic critic James Parker called it "a gibbering, snarling swath of experimental rock, wild but recognizable, in the vein of German pioneers like Can or Faust".

The lyrics of "Why" consist of Ono repeating the word "why" over and over again. Ono also intersperses some non-verbal vocalizations. Pitchfork critic Seth Colter Walls notes that Ono uses a variety of vocal approaches, including "long expressions full of vibrato", "shorter exhalations, rooted in the back of the throat" and "spates of shredded laughter" that according to Walls express "absurdist good humor". Music journalist John Kruth describes the vocals as repeating "the nagging question 'Why?' like a child throwing a fit, unable to be placated no matter what answer the adult struggles to provide", going on to say that "'why' transforms into a terrifying mantra that embodies the cruelty and absurdity of human existence". Pitchfork contributor Sasha Geffen states that Ono sings the word "why" as if she'd be able to find an answer to the question "if she screamed hard enough". Creem critic Dave Marsh stated that Ono used her voice "as John Coltrane used his horn", to "explore every possible nuance of the word-sound (chord) she scats about".

Lennon plays guitar on the track, Klaus Voormann plays bass and Ringo Starr plays drums. Music lecturers Ben Urish and Ken Bielen describe Lennon's guitar playing as "searing" and "cascading", "matching Ono's vocals as she screams the title word over and over". Blaney describes Lennon's guitar playing as "explosive", stating that his guitar "howls like a banshee, matching the vocals perfectly". Fab Four FAQ author Robert Rodriguez considered Lennon's playing "the most adventurous Lennon guitar playing ever recorded". Walls states that the song "contains some of Lennon's most aggressive guitar work". Walls states that the "slide guitar swoops and febrile picking" in the intro anticipate Ono's varied vocalizations.

Lennon claimed that Ono's singing influenced his guitar playing and stated that he was proud that "even we didn't know where Yoko's voice started and where my guitar ended on the intro".

Walls describes Starr's drumming and Voorman's bass playing as "minimalist", stating that it provides a foil for Ono's vocal and Lennon's guitar inventions. Urish and Bielen similarly state that they provide "firm support" for Ono and Lennon. Rodriguez describes them as a "cooking rhythm section".

== Reception ==
Upon its single release, Record World called it a "freakout." Urish and Bielen claim that "Why" "embodies slicing pain, and [Ono's and Lennon's] musical interactions are a marvel to hear, in what is clearly one of their finest joint efforts". Rodriguez calls it "a fascinating slide of proto-punk", although stating that it can be ignored by those who consider Ono's work to be "ear-spitting yammering". Goldmine contributor Gillian G. Gaar similarly states that "Why" "has Ono matching the wildness of Lennon's guitar playing by screaming out the song's title, a sonic blast of proto-punk. Pop Matters critic Adam Mason states that "Why" is "raw, aggressive, menacing and, yes, primal, wherein Yoko screams her 'why' in different tones as an apparent method of emotional catharsis, the savage sound of the band reflecting her inner turmoil and rage". Music critic Johnny Rogan called it "Yoko Ono at her most intense, screaming against a solid rock backing". Journalist Duncan Fallowell stated that "Why" is "the most ferocious and frantic piece of rock [he'd] heard in a long time". The Spill Magazine critic Aaron Badgley described as "brilliant" the way "Lennon's guitar turns into Yoko's voice".

Blaney states that Lennon's guitar work on this track was superior to that of any guitar hero, including Jimi Hendrix. Allmusic critic James Chrispell also praised Lennon's guitar playing on "Why". Rolling Stone critic Lester Bangs praised Lennon's "strong and sizzling" guitar work with "eloquent distortions" on the entire Yoko Ono/Plastic Ono Band album and said specifically of "Why" that "when he suddenly shifts down from those flurries into an expertly abstracted guitar line straight out of Chuck Berry, it just takes your breath away".

Guitarist Gary Lucas stated that:

John Lennon was always able to make his guitar talk. He was one of the most visceral from-the-gut rock guitarists of all time. But never more so than on "Why", where his guitar spits lovely, processed shards of metal to inspire Yoko Ono's uninhibited caterwauling. The is some of the most radical guitar soloing of the era, rivaling Lou Reed's "I Heard Her Call My Name", Syd Barrett's "Interstellar Overdrive" and Robert Fripp on "Cat Food" for sheer sonic bravado.

== Influence ==
Blaney believes that the B-52s were influenced by Ono's vocal style, particularly on this track, and also that the Pixies were influenced by Lennon's guitar playing on this track.

Singer-songwriter Peter Case said:

More than the Stooges' "1969", "Why" invented punk rock. I still play that record in my pad, loud, on a regular basis. It's so focused and unhinged. The band rocks so completely! "Why" just says everything about "why" I love rock 'n roll ... the first thirty seconds with John's shouts and sliding guitar chaos, and Yoko's sometimes cutting, sometimes sustaining screams ... there's horror and humor in it too.

== Warzone version ==
Ono included a shorter but slower and tuneless version of "Why" on her 2018 album Warzone. This version removed the instrumentation from the original version and replaced it with animal sounds and synthesizers. Pitchfork contributor Sasha Geffen stated that the original version "looks out onto a course that has yet to be set" while the Warzone version "looks back onto irreversible wreckage". The Guardian critic Alexis Petridis states that this version is "not easy listening, but it's incredibly potent".
