= Yoko Ono/Plastic Ono Band =

Studio album by Yoko Ono with Plastic Ono Band
- Released: 11 December 1970
- Recorded: February 1968 ("AOS"); 10 October – 6 November 1970
- Studios: EMI, London; Royal Albert Hall, London ("AOS")
- Genres: Experimental rock; proto-punk
- Length: 40:29
- Label: Apple
- Producers: Yoko Ono, John Lennon

Yoko Ono chronology
Live Peace in Toronto 1969 (with The Plastic Ono Band) (1969)	Yoko Ono/Plastic Ono Band (1970)	Fly (1971)

Yoko Ono/Plastic Ono Band is the debut solo album by the Japanese artist and musician Yoko Ono, released on Apple Records on 11 December 1970, the same day as her husband's album John Lennon/Plastic Ono Band. The album features Ono's vocal improvisations accompanied by the Plastic Ono Band (consisting of Lennon on guitar, Ringo Starr on drums, and Klaus Voormann on bass), with the exception of "AOS", on which she is backed by the Ornette Coleman Quartet.

In the United States, Yoko Ono/Plastic Ono Band peaked at number 182 on the Billboard album chart. The album was poorly received upon release, with the exception of supportive reviews by Billboard and Lester Bangs of Rolling Stone. Despite its lack of commercial success, it has been influential on a variety of subsequent musicians.

== Recording ==
With the exception of "AOS", Yoko Ono/Plastic Ono Band was recorded at Abbey Road Studios during the same September–October 1970 sessions that produced John Lennon/Plastic Ono Band. Also recorded at this time was "Between the Takes", which was released on the 1998 CD reissue of Ono's 1971 album Fly. "Greenfield Morning I Pushed an Empty Baby Carriage All Over the City" was based on a sample from a tape of George Harrison playing sitar and drums by Ringo Starr treated with tape echo, with lyrics referencing a miscarriage that were derived from Ono's 1964 book Grapefruit. Ono's vocalisations on tracks such as "Why" and "Why Not" mixed hetai, a Japanese vocal technique from kabuki theatre, with rock vocal styles and a raw aggression influenced by the then-popular primal therapy that Lennon and Ono were undertaking at the time. According to Ono, the recording engineers were in the habit of turning off the recording equipment when she began to perform; at the end of "Why", Lennon can thus be heard asking "Were you gettin' that?"

On 29 February 1968, Ono appeared onstage at London's Royal Albert Hall with avant-garde jazz musician Ornette Coleman and his quartet, then consisting of drummer Ed Blackwell and bassists Charlie Haden and David Izenzon. The performance and their afternoon rehearsal were both recorded; "AOS" was recorded during the rehearsal and included on the album, the only track not featuring the Plastic Ono Band. Describing how she met Coleman, Ono has stated:

Ornette was already very, very established and famous and respected guy as a musician. And I met him in Paris. The way I met was, I was doing a show and after the show, somebody said, Oh, Ornette Coleman is here and he would like to – okay. Well, hello. Thank you for coming. That kind of thing. And he was saying, Well, okay. So he said that he was going to go and do a concert in Albert Hall and would I come and do it with him because he thought it was kind of interesting what I do.

== Critical reception ==
Professional ratings
Review scores
Source	Rating
AllMusic	4.5/5 stars
Rolling Stone	Positive
Pitchfork	9.1/10

Yoko Ono/Plastic Ono Band was released through Apple Records to considerable critical disdain on 11 December 1970, at a time when Ono was widely blamed for the recent break-up of The Beatles. It peaked at number 182 during a three-week run on the Billboard album chart in the United States, and failed to chart in the United Kingdom. Among the few favorable contemporary reviews were those of Billboard, which called it "visionary", and Rolling Stone critic Lester Bangs, who called it "the first J&Y album that doesn’t insult the intelligence—in fact, in its dark confounding way, it’s nearly as beautiful as John’s album… There’s something happening here." He further stated, "It wasn't until the long freak-out on the back of the live Toronto LP that Yoko began to show some signs that she was learning to control and direct her vocal spasms, and John finally evidenced a nascent understanding of the Velvet Underground-type feedback discipline that would best underscore her histrionics."

=== Legacy and impact ===
More recently, the album has been credited with having an influence on musicians disproportionate to its sales and visibility, akin to that of the Velvet Underground. David Browne of Entertainment Weekly has credited the album with "launching a hundred or more female alternative rockers, like Kate Pierson & Cindy Wilson of the B-52s to [sic] current thrashers like L7 and Courtney Love of Hole". NPR Music ranked the album at number 136 on their 2017 list of "The 150 Greatest Albums Made By Women"; the site's Marissa Lorusso deemed it "jarring, experimental and stunning" and cited its "fearless curiosity" as influencing subsequent experimental rock, experimental electronic music, post-punk, and sound art.

In a 2017 Bandcamp Daily feature on Ono's impact, British electronic musician Kiran Leonard applauded the album, writing: "to do what Ono does with her voice on Plastic Ono Band is no easy task... the strength and range of vocal techniques on [the album] is simply astonishing."

== Release ==
The covers of Yoko Ono/Plastic Ono Band and John Lennon/Plastic Ono Band are nearly identical. Lennon pointed out the difference in their 1980 Playboy interview: "in Yoko's, she's leaning back on me; in mine, I'm leaning on her". The photos were taken with an Instamatic camera on the grounds of their Tittenhurst Park estate in Berkshire by actor Daniel Richter, who lived with them and worked as their assistant at the time.

The album was reissued on compact disc by Rykodisc in 1997, with three bonus tracks from the era. An "LP replica" special edition was issued by V2 Records in Japan in 2007, and the album was reissued again on LP, compact disc, and digital download by Secretly Canadian in 2016, with bonus tracks and rare photos.

An alternate version of "Open Your Box", the B-side to the UK issue of Lennon's 1971 single "Power to the People", appears on the 1997 and 2016 reissues.

== Track listing ==
All songs written by Yoko Ono.

=== Original release ===
Side one

1. "Why" – 5:37
2. "Why Not" – 9:55
3. "Greenfield Morning I Pushed an Empty Baby Carriage All Over the City" – 5:38

Side two

1. "AOS" – 7:06
2. "Touch Me" – 4:37
3. "Paper Shoes" – 7:26

=== 1997 reissue ===
Tracks 1–6 per the 1970 release, with the following bonus tracks:

7. "Open Your Box" (alternate version) – 7:35
8. "Something More Abstract" – 0:44
9. "The South Wind" – 16:38

=== 2016 reissue ===
Tracks 1–6 per the 1970 release, with the following bonus tracks:

7. "Open Your Box" (alternate version) – 7:35
8. "Something More Abstract" – 0:44
9. "Why" (extended version) – 8:41
10. "The South Wind" – 16:38

=== Yoko Ono/Plastic Ono Band – The Live Sessions (2020) ===
The 2020 deluxe box set of John Lennon/Plastic Ono Band included a Blu-ray disc containing the unedited live sessions for Yoko Ono/Plastic Ono Band as well as three previously unreleased songs and three B-sides that appeared on John Lennon singles in 1969 and 1970. "Life" is the full version of the track "Between the Takes", which appeared as a bonus track on CD reissues of Fly.

1. "Why" (Live Session) – 18:00
2. "Why Not" (Live Session) – 21:22
3. "Greenfield Morning I Pushed an Empty Baby Carriage All Over the City" (Live Session) – 8:22
4. "Touch Me" (Live Session) – 15:54
5. "Paper Shoes" (Live Session) – 12:17
6. "Life" – 6:57
7. "Omae No Okaa Wa" – 6:31
8. "I Lost Myself Somewhere in the Sky" – 5:01
9. "Remember Love" – 4:04
10. "Don't Worry Kyoko" (Live Session) – 9:29
11. "Who Has Seen the Wind?" – 2:09

== Personnel ==
- Yoko Ono – vocals
- John Lennon – guitars (all but 4)
- Klaus Voormann – bass guitar (all but 4)
- Ringo Starr – drums (all but 4)
- George Harrison – sitar (3)
- Ornette Coleman – trumpet (4)
- Charlie Haden – double bass (4)
- David Izenzon – double bass (4)
- Ed Blackwell – drums (4)

Technical personnel

- Phil McDonald – engineering
- John Leckie – engineering
- Andy Stevens – engineering
- "Eddie" – engineering

== Charts ==
Chart performance of Yoko Ono/Plastic Ono Band
Chart (1970)	Peak position	Total weeks
US Billboard 200	182	3

== Release history ==
Release history of Yoko Ono/Plastic Ono Band
Country	Date	Format	Label	Catalog	Ref.
United States	11 December 1970	LP	Apple	SW 3373	
United States	11 December 1970	Cassette	Apple	4XW 3373	
United States	11 December 1970	8-Track	Apple	8XW 3373	
United Kingdom	11 December 1970	LP	Apple	SAPCOR 17	
Japan (Promo)	1970	LP (Red)	Apple	AP-80175	
Japan	13 January 1971	LP	Apple	AP-80175	
United States	20 May 1997	CD	Rykodisc	RCD 10414	
United Kingdom	16 June 1997	CD	Rykodisc	RCD 10414	
Japan	23 July 1997	CD	Rykodisc	VACK-5370	
Japan	24 January 2007	Rykodisc, Apple	Rykodisc	VACK-1308	
United States & Europe	11 November 2016	LP	Secretly Canadian, Chimera Music	SC281/CHIM20	
United States & Europe	11 November 2016	LP (Clear)	Secretly Canadian, Chimera Music	SC281/CHIM20	
United States & Europe	11 November 2016	CD	Secretly Canadian, Chimera Music	SC281/CHIM20	
Japan	7 December 2016	CD	Sony Records International	SICX-73	
Japan	22 February 2017	LP (Clear)	Sony Records International	SIJP-33	
