= Touch Me (Yoko Ono song) =

Song by Yoko Ono

Single by Yoko Ono & Plastic Ono Band

from the album Yoko Ono/Plastic Ono Band
- A-side: "Power to the People" (John Lennon & Plastic Ono Band)
- Released: March 22, 1971 (US only)
- Recorded: September–October 1970
- Studio: Abbey Road Studios, London
- Length: 3:40
- Label: Apple
- Songwriter: Yoko Ono
- Producers: John Lennon; Yoko Ono

"Touch Me" is a song written by Yoko Ono that was first released on her 1970 album Yoko Ono/Plastic Ono Band. An edited version was later released in the U.S. as the B-side to John Lennon's single "Power to the People".

"Touch Me" was recorded at Abbey Road Studios in London during recording sessions in September and October 1970.

== Music and vocals ==
"Touch Me" features vocals by Ono backed by Lennon on guitar, Klaus Voormann on bass guitar and Ringo Starr on drums. Beatle biographer John Blaney describes the instrumentation provided by Lennon, Voormann and Starr as a "jazz-rock fusion" and states that "their investigations into group dynamics [produce] a wave of sound to support Ono's vocal modulations." On the other hand, Beatle biographer Bruce Spizer states that the song consists of "little more than Yoko wailing over a changing and disjointed musical backdrop." Music lecturers Ben Urish and Ken Bielen describe the song as "a gritty effort, with grumbling and staccato guitar work from Lennon under Ono's alternately fractured and wavering vocals." Music critic Johnny Rogan describes the song as a "highly wrought performance by Yoko, reinforced by instrumental contributions from Lennon, Voormann and Starr." In addition to instrumentation, the song includes the sound of a tree falling early on.

== Interpretations ==
Pop Matters critic Adam Mason interprets "Touch Me" as an outpouring of Ono's inner torment. Musician Thollem McDonas described "Touch Me" as "a desperate plea for connectivity." He went on to state that:

John's guitar seems to ascend, going on infinitely, while Ringo plays the drums like orchestral timpani. The pause at 3:25 is so pregnant. It makes you wonder, where is this piece going? It's like the beginning of the end...Sweet anticipation that is ultimately unfulfilled, before dissolving into the sound of joyful, or wrathful, creatures.

According to Blaney, the song was improvised. Blaney describes Ono's improvisations as being "the first step in Ono's creative praxis", and that she intends for the listener to add to her work and thus "elicit positive reciprocity". Ono has stated that "I called it Unfinished Music, which meant that you were supposed to put your own thing on, in the same way that remixers do today."

== Single release ==
While in the UK Ono's "Open Your Box" appeared as the B-side of "Power to the People", that song was censored by the record company in the US as a result of a belief that it promoted promiscuity, particularly a line suggesting that Lennon should open his legs. As a result, "Touch Me" replaced "Open Your Box" as the B-side to "Power to the People" in the US. According to Ono biographer Jerry Hopkins, "Touch Me" was selected largely because it was a track from Yoko Ono/Plastic Ono Band that was short enough to fit. Nonetheless, the version on the single was edited down to 3:40, from 4:37 on the album version.
