= The Enid =

British progressive rock band

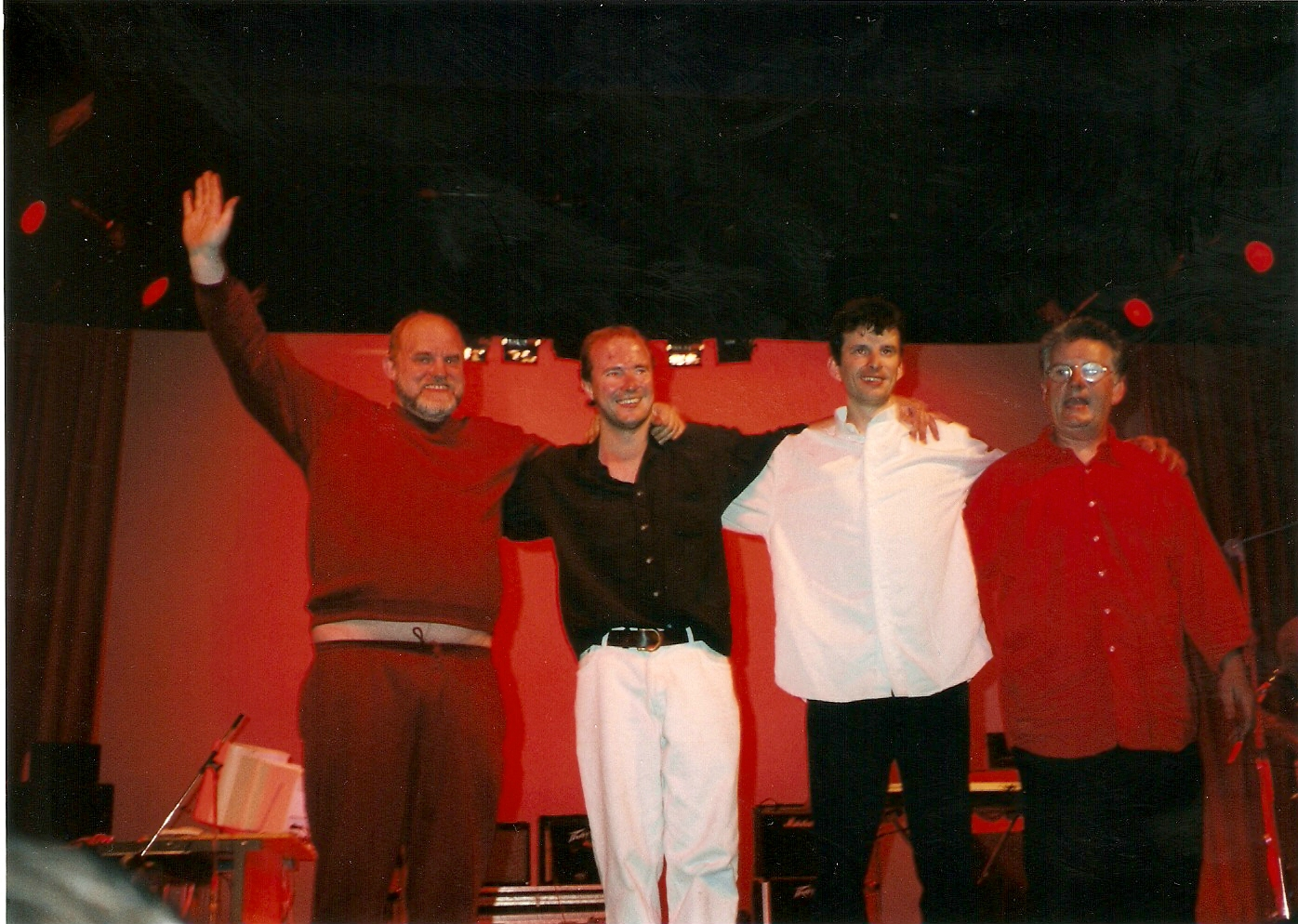
- The Enid in 1998

Background information
- Origin: UK
- Genres: Progressive rock; symphonic rock; art rock
- Years active: 1973–1999, 2002–present
- Label: Operation Seraphim
- Members: Robert John Godfrey; Jason Ducker; Alfredo Randazzo; Karl Thompson; Tim Harries
- Past members: See "Members"
- Website: theenid.co.uk

The Enid are a British progressive rock band founded by keyboardist and composer Robert John Godfrey. Godfrey received his main musical education from The Royal College of Music. He is previously known for his work with Barclay James Harvest, and as a recording artist on the Charisma label. In 2014, he won the Visionary Award (Progressive Music Awards) for establishing an early fan-based crowdfunding model to finance the band named The Stand.

In 1973, Godfrey, together with friends Francis Lickerish, Stephen Stewart and David Williams founded The Enid. They had all met at the famous experimental educational establishment, Finchden Manor. In 1974, they were joined by Dave Storey and Glen Tollet.

== History ==
The Enid began recording at about the same time as punk rock burst upon the music scene. Godfrey has said that he always regarded The Enid's ironic takes on classical music as being just as anarchic as anything by the Sex Pistols, but this did not translate into either musical or commercial recognition, despite their work being played frequently by Tommy Vance on BBC Radio One's Friday Rock Show. However, unique among progressive rock bands, the Enid secured a fan base which significantly overlapped with the punk rock fan base. Thanks largely to their quirky appearance and stage act, they built a sizable campus following even while under the shadow of the punk movement.

Early albums were entirely instrumental due to the suicide of founding vocalist Peter Roberts on New Year's Day 1975, shortly before rehearsals for the band's debut album In the Region of the Summer Stars; the band considered Roberts to be irreplaceable.

The band's record label, Pye Records, folded on the eve of releasing a double compilation album, Rhapsody in Rock, leaving the Enid with substantial bills and no income to cover them. Only continued touring kept the band afloat. In 1981, the Enid were Kim Wilde's backing band on her self-titled debut album. However, according to Godfrey, because the album was recorded in the Enid's studio, they were paid only "a pittance" for their work on it. During this period founding member Francis Lickerish was ousted from the Enid following a failed attempt to take leadership of the group from Godfrey.

The band's fifth album, Something Wicked This Way Comes, released in 1983, was the first Enid album to feature lyrics, which were written by then-drummer Chris North and sung in a mock-operatic style by Godfrey. The release was a concept album dealing with the threat of nuclear warfare and the various ways in which people respond to it.

The Enid released no full-length albums between 1997 and 2010, when Journey's End was released, although 2009's Arise and Shine featured newly remixed and partly re-recorded tracks from previous albums plus one preview of a Journey's End track.

In December 2012, the band's thirteenth album Invicta was voted 9th in The Guardian's "Readers' albums of 2012" poll, with "The One and the Many" placed 6th in the "Readers' tracks of 2012" category.

In June 2013, it was revealed that the band's sole remaining founding member Robert John Godfrey had been diagnosed with early Alzheimer's disease, and that as a result he was retiring from the band. The band opted to continue, with Godfrey's consent, following his departure. The ownership and trade mark of the band name was transferred to Jason Ducker.

Keyboardist William Gilmour founded a new band, Craft, after leaving The Enid, along with Grant McKay Gilmour and Martin Russell of Afro Celt Sound System. The band produced a self-titled mini-album in 1984 featuring Enid-style instrumentals based on six signs of the zodiac: "Aries", "Taurus", "Gemini", "Cancer", "Leo", and "Virgo". The album was released on CD on the American label Kinetic Discs in 1992. The CD added two short bonus tracks, "Branislana" and "And So to Sleep", which were, if anything, even more heavily influenced by The Enid.

In March 2016 Godfrey revealed that he would be retiring from touring, with keyboardist Zach Bullock and vocalist Joe Payne covering all aspects of Godfrey's performance; with the line-up for the following tour consisting of Bullock, Payne, guitarists Jason Ducker and Max Read, drummer Dave Storey, and new bassist Josh Judd. It was revealed the following month that Godfrey was in fact permanently retiring from the band in an official capacity.

On 5 September 2016 it was announced that Payne had departed the band after five years as frontman; and three days later it was revealed that guitarist Read and Storey had also decided to leave The Enid, and that the band now consisted of Bullock, Ducker, and returning multi-instrumentalist Dominic Tofield.

In April 2018 Godfrey announced his return to the band. A brain scan intended to determine the progress of his Alzheimer's disease showed no presence of Alzheimer's at all. In January 2020, The Enid consisted of two members, Godfrey and Ducker, and they were working on the new album U, which earlier was intended to be released as a Godfrey solo album called Homily.

== Marketing innovations ==
In addition to traditional vinyl and CD releases, in the late 1990s the band pioneered the production of "Bespoke CDs" – mail-order custom compilation CD-Rs containing rare tracks chosen by listeners from a catalogue. This service was discontinued after a couple of years.

In the 2001 the band formed a marketing agreement with Inner Sanctum that saw most of the band's back-catalogue being reissued on that label. However, in 2009 they announced that Inner Sanctum was illegally attempting to take control of the band's name and copyrights. As a result of the ensuing legal action the Journey's End album was released on the band's own Enidiworks/Operation Seraphim label. The Enid stated that in 2010 Inner Sanctum released illegal bootlegs of the original EMI versions of In the Region of the Summer Stars and Aerie Faerie Nonsense. As a result of this EMI took action against Gerald Palmer to stop the bootlegs and agreed to grant a worldwide license to Operation Seraphim (the band's own record label) for the three albums EMI owns (In The Region, Aerie Faerie Nonsense, and Godfrey's 1974 solo album The Fall of Hyperion).

In March 2006 Godfrey announced on the band's website that he would be making its entire back catalogue available for free download as high-quality mp3s. Godfrey wrote: "The purpose of this is to make sure that The Enid's music reaches as many people as possible and does not entirely disappear when I am dead. The Enid represents my life's work and I want it and what it contains to live on in those who warm to it. Having taken this decision it may well influence the way I think about The Enid and may drive me to do some more."

== Personnel ==
=== Members ===
Current members

- Robert John Godfrey – keyboards, vocals (1973–99, 2007–16, 2018–present)
- Jason Ducker – guitars, bass, keyboards, vocals (2007–present)
- Tim Harries – bass (2023–present)
- Karl Thompson – drums, percussion, and vocals (2020–present)
- Alfredo Randazzo – guitars (2022–present)

Former members

- Steve Stewart – guitars, bass, vocals (1973–88)
- Francis Lickerish – guitars (1973–80, 1984, 1988)
- Peter Roberts – vocals (1973–75; died 1975)
- Nick Magnus – keyboards (1976)
- David Williams – bass (1973–74)
- Dave Storey – drums, percussion (1974–75, 1976–79, 1984–88, 1998–99, 2007–16)
- Glen Tollet – bass, keyboards, tuba (1974–76)
- Neil Kavanagh – bass (1974–75)
- Robbie Dobson – drums, percussion (1975–76, 1979–80)
- Charlie Elston – keyboards (1976–77)
- Jeremy Tranter – bass (1976)
- Terry "Thunderbags" Pack – bass (1976–79, 1985)
- William Gilmour – keyboards (1977–80)
- Martin Russell – keyboards, bass (1979–80)
- Tony Freer – cor anglais, oboe (1979)
- Chris North – drums, percussion (1980–84, 1984–88)
- Colin Woolway - drums (1984)
- Robert Perry – keyboards (1988)
- Damian Risdon – drums, percussion (1987-88)
- Niall Feldman – bass (1987-88)
- Wayne Cox – drums, percussion (1993–95)
- Gary Mendel – bass (1993–95)
- Steve Hughes – drums and percussion (1993–98)
- Nick May – guitars, bass, keyboards (1993–95)
- Tobey Horsenail – vocal FX (1995)
- Kes – vocal FX (1995)
- Torin – vocal FX (1995)
- Grant Jamieson – guitars (1995–99)
- Alex Tsentides – bass (1995–97)
- Max Read – guitars, bass, vocal FX (1997–99, 2007–16)
- Nicholas Willes – bass, percussion, guitar (2009-14)
- Joe Payne – vocals, keyboards (2011–16)
- Zach Bullock – vocals, keyboards (2015–2019)
- Josh Judd – bass (2016)

=== Lineups ===
1973–1975	1975	1975–1976	1976
Robert John Godfrey – keyboards; Francis Lickerish – guitars; Peter Roberts – vocals; Steve Stewart – guitars; David Williams – bass	Robert John Godfrey – keyboards, vocals; Francis Lickerish – guitars; Steve Stewart – guitars, bass; Neil Kavanagh – bass; Dave Storey – drums, percussion; Glen Tollet – bass, keyboards, tuba	Robert John Godfrey – keyboards, vocals; Francis Lickerish – guitars; Steve Stewart – guitars, bass; Glen Tollet – bass, keyboards, tuba; Robbie Dobson – drums, percussion	Robert John Godfrey – keyboards, vocals; Francis Lickerish – guitars; Steve Stewart – guitars, bass; Jeremy Tranter – bass; Nick Magnus - keyboards; Robbie Dobson – drums, percussion
1976–1977	1977	1977–1979	1979
Robert John Godfrey – keyboards, vocals; Francis Lickerish – guitars; Steve Stewart – guitars, bass; Charlie Elston – keyboards; Dave Storey – drums, percussion; Terry "Thunderbags" Pack – bass	Robert John Godfrey – keyboards, vocals; Francis Lickerish – guitars; Steve Stewart – guitars, bass; Dave Storey – drums, percussion; Terry "Thunderbags" Pack – bass; William Gilmour – keyboards	Robert John Godfrey – keyboards, vocals; Francis Lickerish – guitars; Steve Stewart – guitars, bass; Dave Storey – drums, percussion; Terry "Thunderbags" Pack – bass; William Gilmour – keyboards	Robert John Godfrey – keyboards, vocals; Francis Lickerish – guitars; Steve Stewart – guitars, bass; William Gilmour – keyboards; Dave Storey – drums, percussion; Tony Freer – cor anglais, oboe; Terry "Thunderbags" Pack – bass; Martin Russell – keyboards, bass
1979–1980	1980–1983	1983–1984	1984
Robert John Godfrey – keyboards, vocals; Francis Lickerish – guitars; Steve Stewart – guitars, bass; William Gilmour – keyboards; Robbie Dobson – drums, percussion; Martin Russell – keyboards, bass	Robert John Godfrey – keyboards, vocals; Steve Stewart – guitars, bass; Chris North – drums, percussion; Martin Russell – keyboards, bass	Robert John Godfrey – keyboards, vocals; Steve Stewart – guitars, bass; Chris North – drums, percussion; Martin Russell – keyboards, bass	Robert John Godfrey – keyboards, vocals; Steve Stewart – guitars, bass; Glynn Evans – bass; . Colin Woolway - drums; Dave Storey – drums, percussion
1984–1987	1987–1988	1988	1988–1993
Robert John Godfrey – keyboards, vocals; Steve Stewart – guitars, bass; Dave Storey – drums, percussion; Chris North – drums, percussion	Robert John Godfrey – keyboards, vocals; Steve Stewart – guitars, bass; Dave Storey – drums, percussion; Chris North – drums, percussion; Geraldine Connor – vocals; Troy Donockley – whistles; Niall Feldman – bass; Damian Risdon – drums, percussion	Robert John Godfrey – keyboards, vocals; Steve Stewart – guitars, bass; Dave Storey – drums, percussion; Chris North – drums, percussion; Geraldine Connor – vocals; Troy Donockley – whistles; Niall Feldman – bass; Damian Risdon – drums, percussion; Robert Perry – keyboards	Robert John Godfrey – keyboards, vocals; Geraldine Connor – vocals; Troy Donockley – whistles; Niall Feldman – bass; Damian Risdon – drums, percussion
1993	1993–1994	1994–1995	1995
Robert John Godfrey – keyboards, vocals; Gary Mendel – bass; Wayne Cox – drums, percussion; Niel Shepherd – guitars; Nick May – guitars, keyboards, bass	Robert John Godfrey – keyboards, vocals; Gary Mendel – bass; Wayne Cox – drums, percussion; Nick May – guitars, keyboards, bass	Robert John Godfrey – keyboards, vocals; Gary Mendel – bass; Wayne Cox – drums, percussion; Nick May – guitars, keyboards, bass	Robert John Godfrey – keyboards, vocals; Steve Hughes – drums and percussion; Nick May – guitars, keyboards, bass; Tobey Horsenail – vocal FX; Kes – vocal FX; Damian Risdon – drums, percussion; Steve Stewart – guitars, bass; Torin – vocal FX
1995–1997	1997–1998	1998–1999	1999–2007
Robert John Godfrey – keyboards, vocals; Steve Hughes – drums and percussion; Grant Jamieson – guitars; Alex Tsentides – bass	Robert John Godfrey – keyboards, vocals; Steve Hughes – drums and percussion; Grant Jamieson – guitars; Alex Tsentides – bass; Max Read – guitars, bass, vocal FX	Robert John Godfrey – keyboards, vocals; Grant Jamieson – guitars; Alex Tsentides – bass; Max Read – guitars, bass, vocal FX; Dave Storey – drums, percussion	Disbanded
2007–2009	2009–2011	2011–2014	2014–2015
Robert John Godfrey – keyboards, vocals; Max Read – guitars, bass, vocal FX; Dave Storey – drums, percussion; Jason Ducker – guitars, bass, keyboards, vocals	Robert John Godfrey – keyboards, vocals; Max Read – guitars, bass, vocal FX; Dave Storey – drums, percussion; Jason Ducker – guitars, bass, keyboards, vocals; Nicholas Willes – bass, percussion, guitar	Robert John Godfrey – keyboards, vocals; Max Read – guitars, bass, vocal FX; Dave Storey – drums, percussion; Jason Ducker – guitars, bass, keyboards, vocals; Nicholas Willes – bass, percussion, guitar; Joe Payne – vocals, keyboards	Robert John Godfrey – keyboards, vocals; Max Read – guitars, bass, vocal FX; Dave Storey – drums, percussion; Jason Ducker – guitars, bass, keyboards, vocals; Joe Payne – vocals, keyboards; Dominic Tofield – drums, keyboards, percussion, bass, vocals
2015–2016	2016	2016–2018	2018–2019
Robert John Godfrey – keyboards, vocals; Max Read – guitars, bass, vocal FX; Dave Storey – drums, percussion; Jason Ducker – guitars, bass, keyboards, vocals; Joe Payne – vocals, keyboards; Zach Bullock – keyboards, vocals	Max Read – guitars, bass, vocal FX; Dave Storey – drums, percussion; Jason Ducker – guitars, bass, keyboards, vocals; Joe Payne – vocals, keyboards; Zach Bullock – keyboards, vocals; Josh Judd – bass	Jason Ducker – guitars, bass, keyboards vocals; Zach Bullock – vocals, keyboards; Dominic Tofield – drums, keyboards, percussion, bass, vocals	Robert John Godfrey – keyboards, vocals; Jason Ducker – guitars, bass, keyboards vocals; Zach Bullock – vocals, keyboards; Dominic Tofield – drums, keyboards, percussion, bass, vocals
2019–2020	2020–2021	2022–present
Robert John Godfrey – keyboards, vocals; Jason Ducker – guitars, bass, keyboards, vocals	Robert John Godfrey – keyboards, vocals; Jason Ducker – guitars, bass, keyboards, vocals; Dominic Tofield – drums, keyboards, percussion, bass, vocals; Karl Thompson – drums, percussion, vocals	Robert John Godfrey – keyboards, vocals; Jason Ducker – guitars, bass, keyboards, vocals; Tim Harries – bass; Karl Thompson – drums, percussion, vocals; Alfredo Randazzo – guitars

== Discography ==
=== Studio ===
- In the Region of the Summer Stars (1976)
- Aerie Faerie Nonsense (1977)
- Touch Me (1979)
- Six Pieces (1980)
- Something Wicked This Way Comes (1983)
- The Stand (1984)
- The Spell (1985)
- Fand (1985)
- Salome (1986)
- Joined by the Heart (1987)
- The Seed and the Sower (1988)
- Tripping the Light Fantastic (1994)
- Sundialer (1995)
- White Goddess (1997)
- Journey's End (2010)
- Invicta (2012)
- First Light (2014)
- The Bridge (2015)
- Dust (2016)
- Resurgency (2017)
- U (2019)

=== Live ===
- Live at Hammersmith (Vol. 1) (recorded 1979) (1984)
- Live at Hammersmith (Vol. 2) (recorded 1979) (1984)
- The Stand (live) (1984)
- The Enid at Hammersmith 17 October 1986 (official bootleg) (1986)
- The Enid at Hammersmith 30 October 1987 (official bootleg) (1987)
- Final Noise (1988)
- Live at Town Hall, Birmingham (2010)
- Live with The CBSO at Symphony Hall (2012)
- Live and Unreleased (a 2015 concert and live tracks from 2014)
- The Bridge Show – Live at Union Chapel (2015)
- Live at the Citadel (with Robert John Godfrey) (2018)

=== Compilations ===
- The Stand 2 (rarities compilation) (1985)
- Lovers And Fools (retrospective compilation) (1986)
- Liverpool (compilation) (1986)
- Inner Pieces (1987)
- Inner Visions (1988)
- The Story of The Enid (told in words and music by Robert John Godfrey) (1991)
- Anarchy on 45 (singles compilation) (1996)
- Members one of Another (fanclub compilation) (1996)
- Healing Hearts (1996)
- Tears of the Sun (1999)

=== Other albums ===
- Arise and Shine (2009)
- Arise and Shine Volume 2 – Risen (2011)
- Arise and Shine Volume 3 – Shining (2012)

=== Singles ===
- "The Lovers"/"In the Region of Summer Stars" (1976) (Buk BUK 3002)
- "Jubilee"/"Omega" (1977) (EMI International INT 534) release cancelled
- "Golden Earrings"/"Omega" (1977) EMI (BUK) INT 540
- "Dambusters March"/"Land of Hope & Glory"/"The Skyeboat Song" (1979) (Pye 7P 106) (PS, blue vinyl with RAF roundel design)
- "Fool" (with Malcolm Le Maistre)/"Tito" (1980) Pye 7P 187 (PS)
- "Golden Earrings"/"665 The Great Bean" (1980) EMI 5109 (PS)
- "When You Wish Upon a Star"/"Jessica" (1981) (Bronze BRO 127) (PS)
- "Heigh Ho"/"Twinkle Twinkle Little Star" (1980) (Bronze BRO 134)
- "Then There Were None"/"Letter from America" (1982) RAK 349 (PS)
- "Then There Were None"/"Letter from America"/"Raindown" (1984) (PS, 12")
- "Itchycoo Park"/"Sheets of Blue" (1986) (7": Sedition EDIT 3314) (PS) (12" – Sedition EDITL 3314, blue vinyl)
- "Salome"/"Salomee" (1990) (7" – Enid ENID 7999) (PS) (12"- Enid ENID 6999) (PS)
