= The Lodge Recording Studio =

Coordinates: 52.240235°N 0.888689°W

The Lodge Recording Studio is a recording studio in Northampton, England. It is co-owned by Jason Ducker of The Enid and Max Read.

The studio was first established in 1978 in Hertford and then moved to larger premises in Claret Hall Farm, near Clare, Suffolk. It was used by such famous artists as Kim Wilde, The Ruts, Katrina and the Waves, New Model Army, Mari Wilson, Marillion Forger and Paradise Lost using it on a regular basis until 1988 when the owners closed it in order to concentrate on separate musical careers.

In 1992 The Lodge re-opened in Northampton, where it currently operates two studios. The larger main studio still has the vintage 1976 Cadac analogue desk, which was originally installed in Battery Studios in London. There is a large live recording area, used for percussion and separate, soundproof booths. The second studio is equipped with a Yamaha digital desk and features a Yamaha G3 grand piano.
