= Robert John Godfrey =

British musician

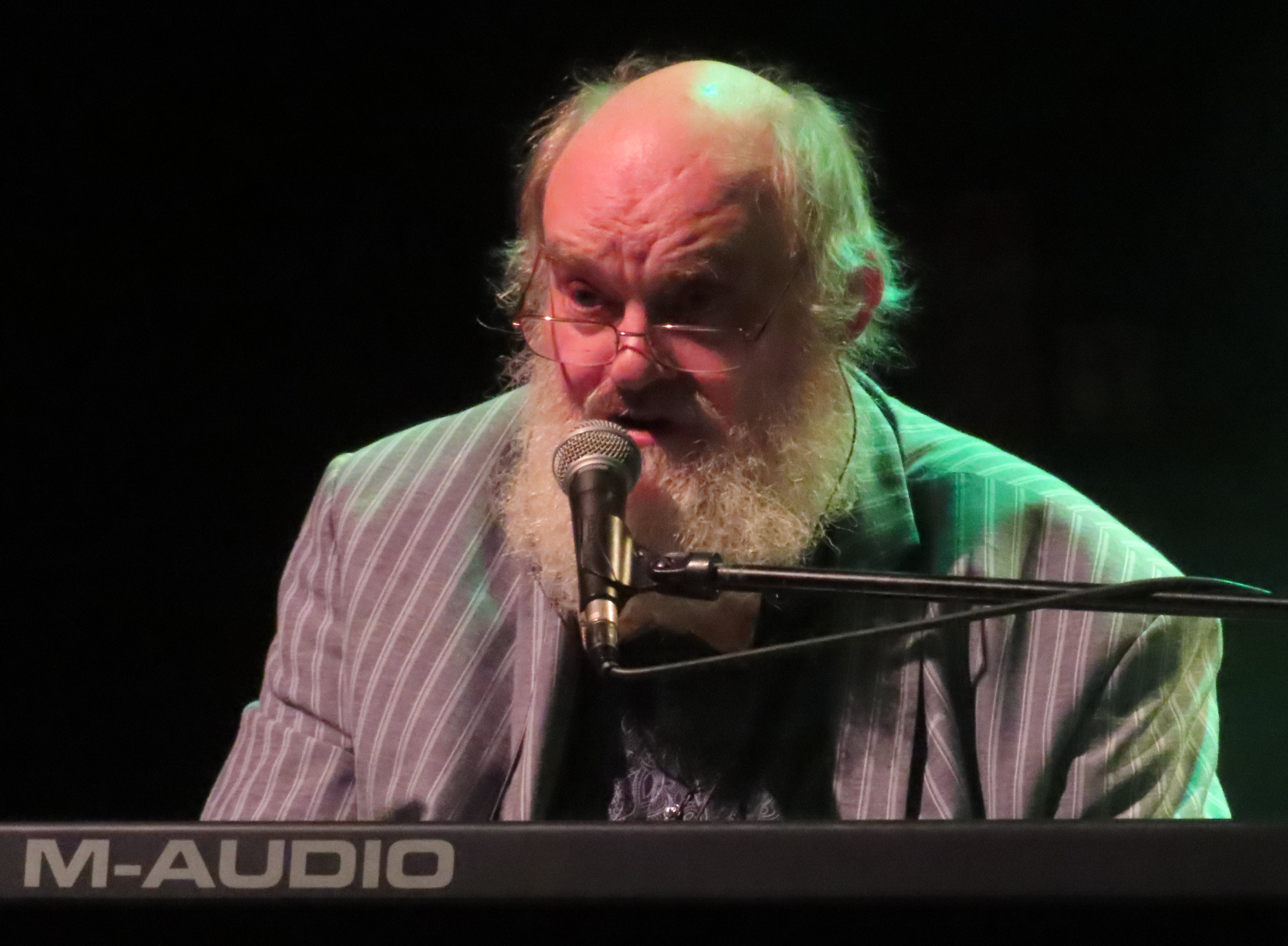
Godfrey in 2021

Robert John Godfrey (born 30 July 1947) is a British composer, pianist and a founding member of The Enid.

== Early career ==
Born on the Leeds Castle estate in Kent, England, Godfrey was privately educated in various prep schools prior to going to Finchden Manor in Tenterden, which was described by its founder George Lyward as a "therapeutic community for adolescents", other alumni of which included Alexis Korner and Tom Robinson. Although he didn't start to play the piano until the age of twelve, Godfrey's talent was prodigious enough to gain him admission to the Royal College of Music, then the Royal Academy of Music. He studied under concert pianist Malcolm Binns, and those around him included Sir Michael Tippett, Benjamin Britten and Hans Werner Henze.

== Career ==
From 1968 to 1971 Godfrey became resident musical director with Barclay James Harvest, making musical contributions to early recordings which established their full, orchestral style of rock music. The relationship fell apart and accounts differ as to why. Godfrey is gay, and claimed this was one reason he was fired from BJH. "It was the band’s girlfriends who forced the issue," he told Classic Rock magazine. "They were from the Lancashire/Yorkshire area and couldn’t handle the idea of a gay man like me with a plummy accent." Years later Godfrey filed a lawsuit alleging he was owed composing credits and corresponding royalties on several of Barclay James Harvest's songs. He established that he had made a significant and original contribution to the creation of the works and must be regarded as a joint author. But as he had waited 14 years before asserting his rights, he was estopped from revoking the implied license granted to Lees for the exploitation of the works.

Before Fall of Hyperion, Godfrey was involved in the embryonic prog rock band Siddhartha who played the university and club circuit before being seen by Tony Stratton Smith (Charisma Records) at the Marquee Club, where they were supporting Mike Patto. The band consisted of Godfrey on Steinway grand piano, Tony Ball bass guitar, Chris Lewis vocals, Nigel King lead guitar, Colin Green Hammond C3 organ and Nigel Culpepper drums. Various other members drifted in and out but these were the main members. The band fell apart through personal and musical differences before they could produce their first album (although somewhere there exists a three track demo recorded at Joe Browns Studio in Chigwell).

In 1974 the Charisma Records label released his first solo album, Fall of Hyperion. It had abysmal sales and Godfrey himself has since described it as "stupid".

He then went on to form The Enid.

Godfrey was the winner of the Visionary award at the 2014 Progressive Music Awards.

He has been diagnosed with Alzheimer's disease. In 2016, he retired from playing with The Enid due to his illness. His last regular performance with the band took place on 2 April 2016. However, in June 2017, it was announced that Godfrey would be joining The Enid in August of that year to celebrate his 70th birthday with a one-off performance at the Union Chapel in London, that took place on 5 August.

== Discography ==
- Fall of Hyperion (1974) (CAS 1084)
- The Music of William Arkle (1986)
- Reverberations (1987)
- The Seed and the Sower (with Steve Stewart) (1988) (later reissued as by The Enid)
- The Story of The Enid (1989)
- The Art of Melody (2013)

== "Fall of Hyperion" track listing ==
1. "The Raven" (8:46)
2. "Mountains" (6:56)
3. "Water Song" (5:57)
4. "End of Side 1" (0:04)
5. "Isault" (5:10)
6. "The Daemon Of The World" (14:44)
  1. "The Arrival Of The Phoenix"
  2. "Across The Abyss"
  3. "'The Daemon"
  4. "The Wanderer"
  5. "IHS"
  6. "Tuba Mirum"

Personnel

- Robert John Godfrey - keyboards
- Christopher Lewis - vocals
- Neil Tetlow - bass
- Jim Scott - guitars
- Tristan Fry - percussion
- Ronnie McCrea - percussion
- Nigel Morton - Hammond organ
