= List of songs recorded by John Lennon =

Songs recorded by John Lennon

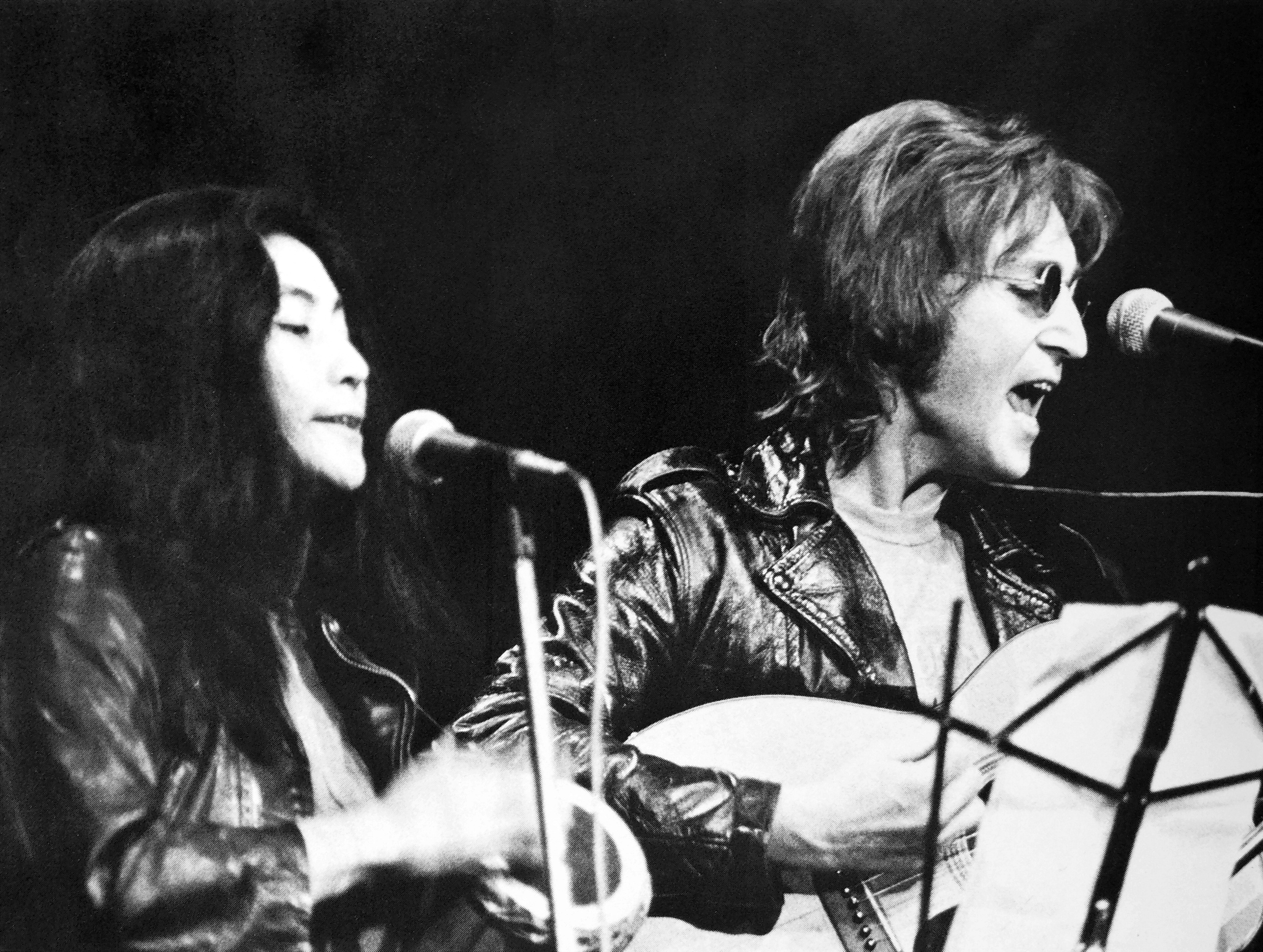
Yoko Ono and John Lennon performing in December 1971

John Lennon (1940–1980) was an English musician who gained prominence as a member of the Beatles. His songwriting partnership with bandmate Paul McCartney is one of the most celebrated in music history. After their break-up, Lennon recorded over 150 songs as a solo artist. Between 1968 and 1969, Lennon released three avant-garde experimental albums with wife Yoko Ono, (Note: Unfinished Music No. 1: Two Virgins (1968), Unfinished Music No. 2: Life with the Lions (1968) and Wedding Album (1969)) as well as a live album and two singles, "Give Peace a Chance" and "Cold Turkey", with the Plastic Ono Band. His debut single before the Beatles' break-up was "Instant Karma!"

Lennon's debut solo album, John Lennon/Plastic Ono Band, was released in late 1970. Influenced by primal scream therapy, its songs are noted for their intense nature and "raw" sound, containing personal lyrics dealing with themes of loss, abandonment, and suffering. Its follow-up, Imagine, was released in 1971. Co-produced by Phil Spector and featuring appearances by former Beatle George Harrison, Imagine features songs with calmer and elaborate arrangements compared to its predecessor, with lyrics discussing peace, love, and notably, an attack on former bandmate Paul McCartney in the song "How Do You Sleep?" Its title track, in particular, is regarded as one of Lennon's finest songs. Also recorded during this time was the Christmas song "Happy Xmas (War Is Over)". Some Time in New York City (1972), a part-studio, part-live album with Yoko Ono and Elephant's Memory, contained songs by both Lennon and Ono, with lyrics discussing political and social issues and topics such as sexism, incarceration, colonialism and racism. Mind Games (1973), Lennon's first self-produced album, marked a return to introspective songwriting, featuring love songs, hard rockers, and bouts of humour. Walls and Bridges (1974), recorded during his 18-month separation from Ono, features rock and pop songs that reflected Lennon's feelings at the time, as well as contributions from Elton John. Rock 'n' Roll (1975), a covers album of late 1950s and early 1960s rock songs, included songs such as "Stand by Me", "Peggy Sue" and "You Can't Catch Me". After Rock 'n' Roll, Lennon took a five-year hiatus from the music industry to raise his son Sean, aside from occasional demos. (Note: These demos included "Free as a Bird", "Real Love" and "Now and Then", all of which were recorded and released under the Beatles name: the first two in 1995 as part of The Beatles Anthology, and the third in 2023.)

Lennon returned to music in 1980 with Ono on the album Double Fantasy. Co-produced by Jack Douglas, the album's songs primarily focus on the couple's relationship, emphasising their love for each other and their son, Sean, with some songs discussing Lennon's hiatus. He was shot and killed by Mark David Chapman three weeks after the album's release. In the years following his death, many previously unissued songs have seen release on other albums, including Milk and Honey (1984), Menlove Ave. (1986), and John Lennon Anthology (1998).

== Songs ==
Key
†	Indicates song not written or co-written by John Lennon
#	Indicates song credited to John Lennon and Yoko Ono

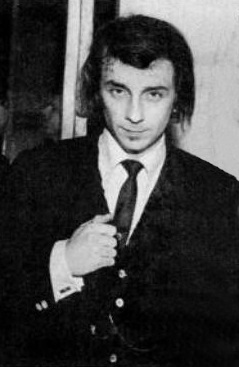
Phil Spector co-produced Lennon's albums John Lennon/Plastic Ono Band (1970), Imagine (1971), Some Time in New York City (1972) and Rock 'n' Roll (1975).

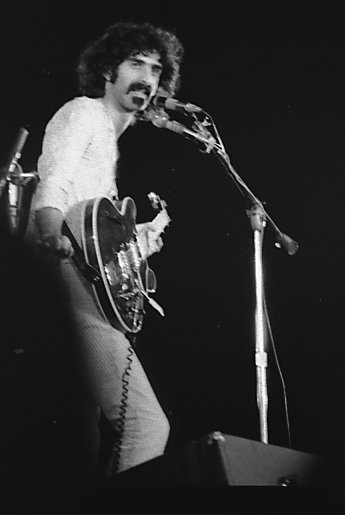
Lennon and Ono performed four songs on Some Time in New York City (1972) live with Frank Zappa and his band the Mothers of Invention.

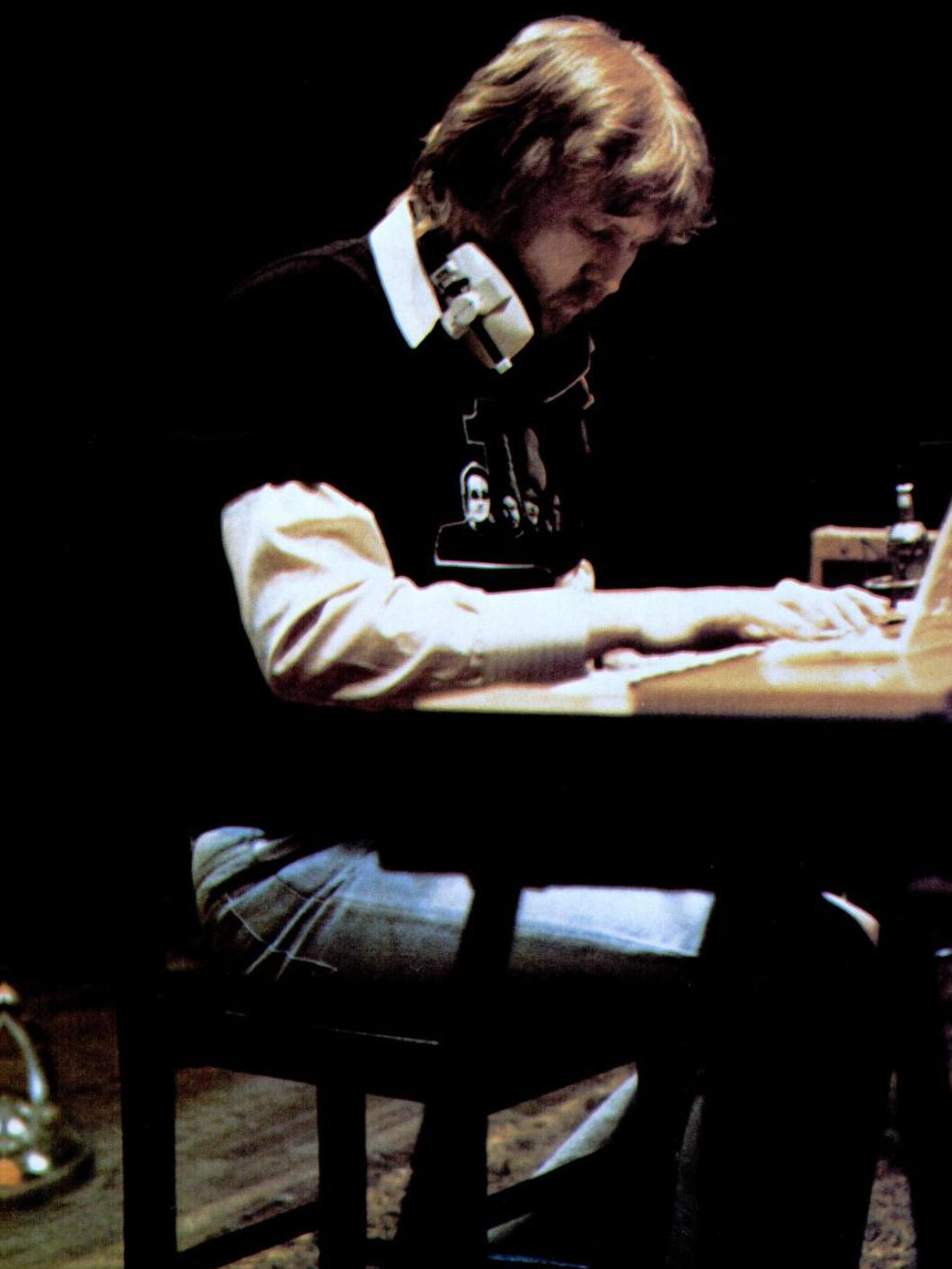
Lennon co-wrote "Old Dirt Road" with Harry Nilsson, released on Walls and Bridges (1974).

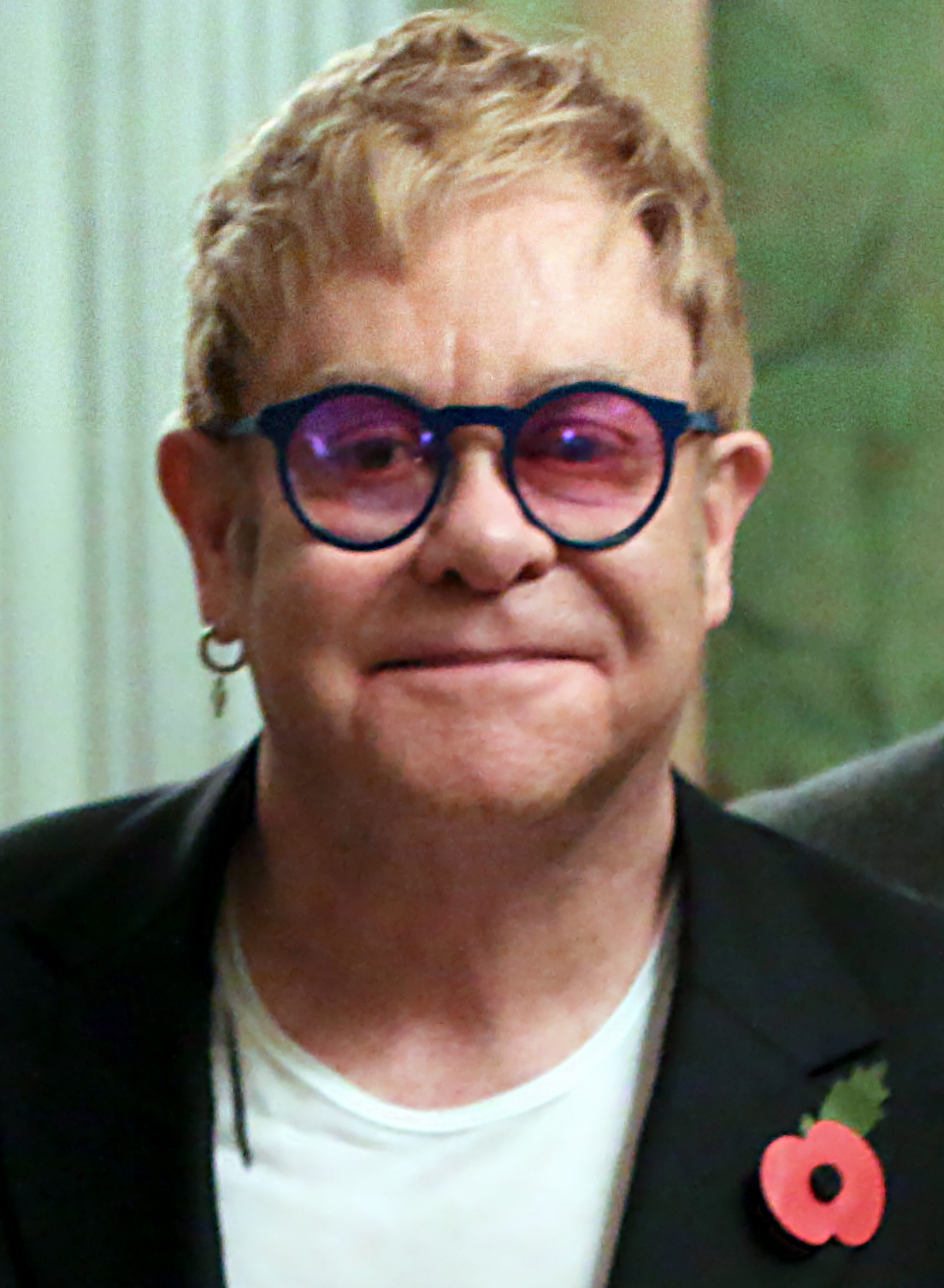
Walls and Bridges contained contributions from Elton John.

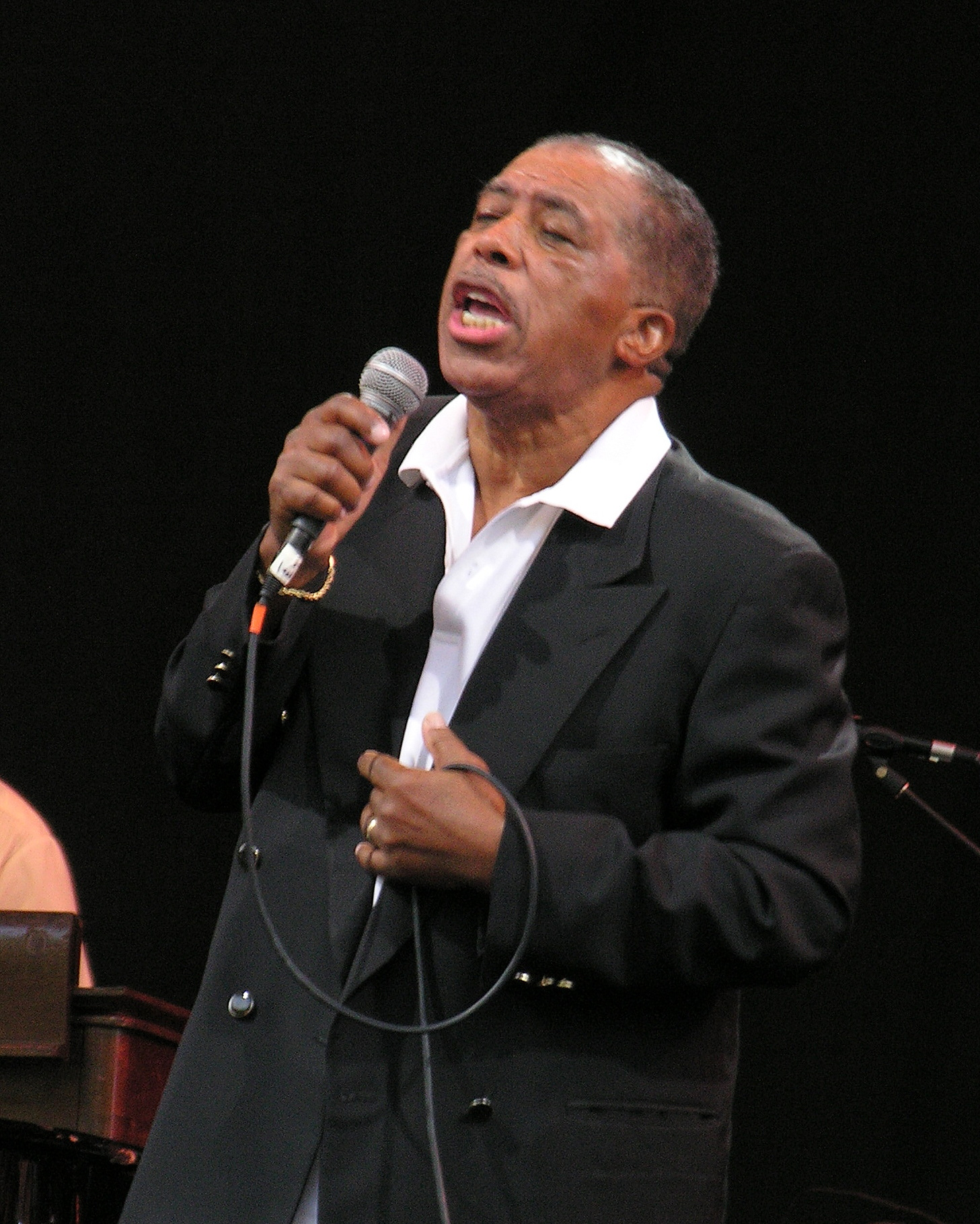
Lennon covered Ben E. King's song "Stand by Me" for his 1975 album Rock 'n' Roll.

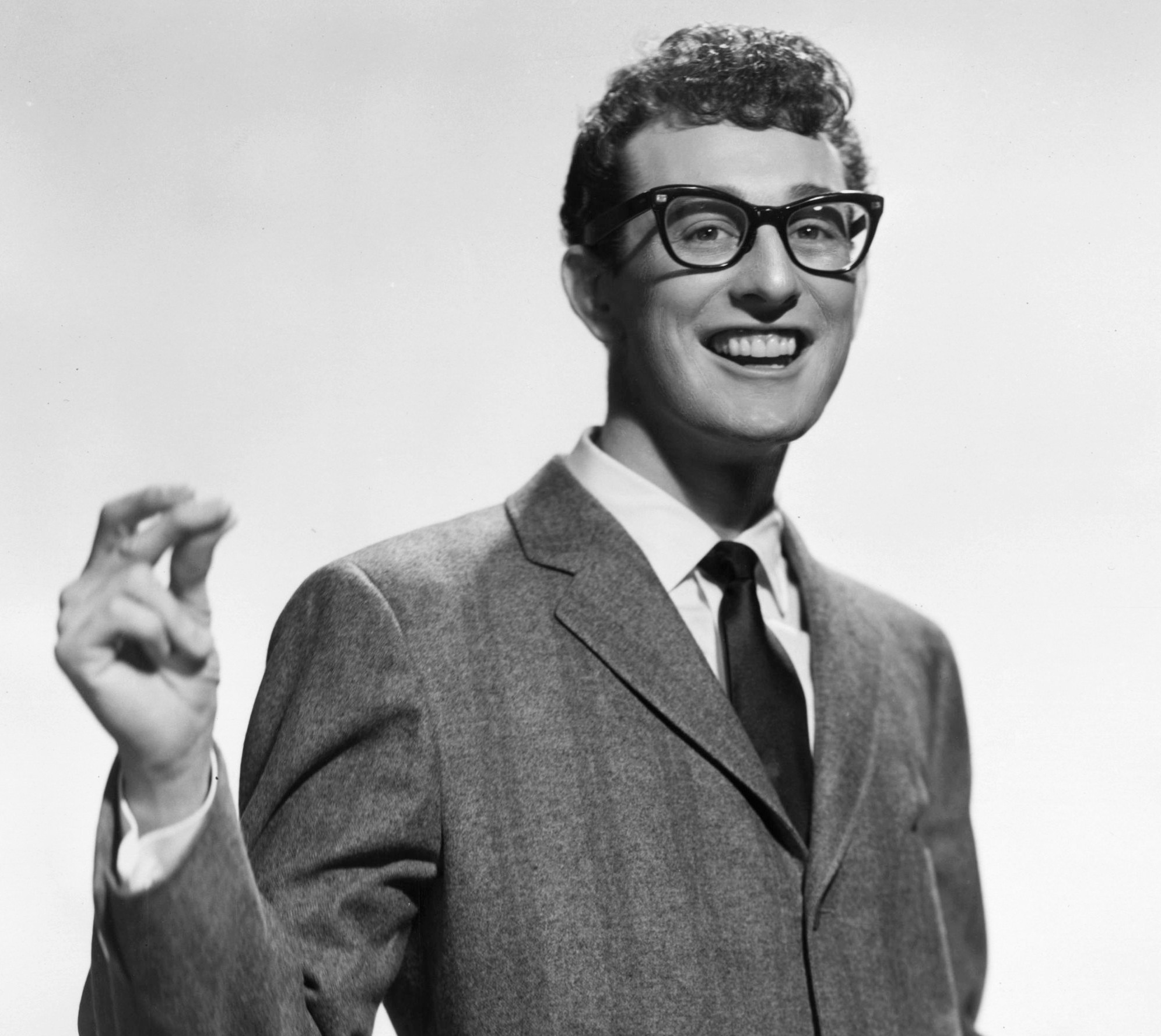
Lennon covered Buddy Holly's song "Peggy Sue" for his 1975 album Rock 'n' Roll.

Name of song, writer(s), original release, producer(s) and year of release
Song	Writer(s)	Original release	Producer(s)	Year	Ref.
"#9 Dream"	John Lennon	Walls and Bridges	John Lennon	1974	
"Ain't She Sweet"	Jack Yellen; Milton Ager †	John Lennon Anthology	Yoko Ono; Rob Stevens	1998	
"Ain't That a Shame"	Fats Domino; Dave Bartholomew †	Rock 'n' Roll	John Lennon	1975	
"Aisumasen (I'm Sorry)"	John Lennon	Mind Games	John Lennon	1973	
"Amsterdam" #	John Lennon; Yoko Ono	Wedding Album	John Lennon; Yoko Ono	1969	
"Angel Baby"	Rosie Hamlin †	Menlove Ave.	John Lennon; Phil Spector	1986	
"Angela" # (with Elephant's Memory)	John Lennon; Yoko Ono	Some Time in New York City	John Lennon; Yoko Ono; Phil Spector	1972	
"Attica State" # (with Elephant's Memory)	John Lennon; Yoko Ono	Some Time in New York City	John Lennon; Yoko Ono; Phil Spector	1972	
"Aü" (live) # (with the Mothers of Invention)	John Lennon; Yoko Ono	Some Time in New York City	John Lennon; Yoko Ono; Phil Spector	1972	
"Baby's Heartbeat" #	John Lennon; Yoko Ono	Unfinished Music No. 2: Life with the Lions	John Lennon; Yoko Ono	1969	
"Be My Baby"	Phil Spector; Ellie Greenwich; Jeff Barry †	John Lennon Anthology	Yoko Ono; Rob Stevens	1998	
"Be-Bop-A-Lula"	Bill Davis; Gene Vincent †	Rock 'n' Roll	John Lennon	1975	
"Beautiful Boy (Darling Boy)" #	John Lennon	Double Fantasy	John Lennon; Yoko Ono; Jack Douglas	1980	
"Beautiful Boys" #	Yoko Ono †	Double Fantasy	John Lennon; Yoko Ono; Jack Douglas	1980	
"Beef Jerky"	John Lennon	Walls and Bridges	John Lennon	1974	
"Bless You"	John Lennon	Walls and Bridges	John Lennon	1974	
"Blue Suede Shoes" (live) (Plastic Ono Band)	Carl Perkins †	Live Peace in Toronto 1969	John Lennon; Yoko Ono	1969	
"Bony Moronie"	Larry Williams †	Rock 'n' Roll	Phil Spector	1975	
"Born in a Prison" # (with Elephant's Memory)	Yoko Ono †	Some Time in New York City	John Lennon; Yoko Ono; Phil Spector	1972	
"Borrowed Time"	John Lennon	Milk and Honey	John Lennon; Yoko Ono	1984	
"Bring On the Lucie (Freda Peeple)"	John Lennon	Mind Games	John Lennon	1973	
"Cambridge 1969" #	John Lennon; Yoko Ono	Unfinished Music No. 2: Life with the Lions	John Lennon; Yoko Ono	1969	
"Cleanup Time" #	John Lennon	Double Fantasy	John Lennon; Yoko Ono; Jack Douglas	1980	
"Cold Turkey" (Note: A live version was released on Some Time in New York City (1972).) (Plastic Ono Band)	John Lennon	Non-album single	John Lennon; Yoko Ono	1969	
"Come Together" (Note: Originally recorded by the Beatles) (live)	John Lennon; Paul McCartney	Live in New York City	Yoko Ono	1986	
"Crippled Inside"	John Lennon	Imagine	John Lennon; Yoko Ono; Phil Spector	1971	
"Dear John"	John Lennon	John Lennon Anthology	Yoko Ono; Rob Stevens	1998	
"Dear Yoko" #	John Lennon	Double Fantasy	John Lennon; Yoko Ono; Jack Douglas	1980	
"Dizzy, Miss Lizzy" (live) (Plastic Ono Band)	Larry Williams †	Live Peace in Toronto 1969	John Lennon; Yoko Ono	1969	
"Do You Want to Dance"	Bobby Freeman †	Rock 'n' Roll	John Lennon	1975	
"Do the Oz"	John Lennon; Yoko Ono	John Lennon Anthology	Yoko Ono; Rob Stevens	1998	
"Don't Be Scared" #	Yoko Ono †	Milk and Honey	John Lennon; Yoko Ono	1984	
"Don't Worry Kyoko" (Yoko Ono and Plastic Ono Band)	Yoko Ono †	Fly	John Lennon; Yoko Ono	1971	
"Every Man Has a Woman Who Loves Him" #	Yoko Ono †	Double Fantasy	John Lennon; Yoko Ono; Jack Douglas	1980	
"(Forgive Me) My Little Flower Princess" #	John Lennon	Milk and Honey	John Lennon; Yoko Ono	1984	
"Free as a Bird" (demo)	John Lennon	–		– (Note: Recorded as a demo in 1977)	
"Gimme Some Truth"	John Lennon	Imagine	John Lennon; Yoko Ono; Phil Spector	1971	
"Give Me Something" #	Yoko Ono †	Double Fantasy	John Lennon; Yoko Ono; Jack Douglas	1980	
"Give Peace a Chance" (Plastic Ono Band)	John Lennon; Paul McCartney (Note: Originally credited to Lennon–McCartney, the song has been solely credited to Lennon on later releases, including Live in New York City.)	Non-album single	John Lennon; Yoko Ono	1969	
"God"	John Lennon	John Lennon/Plastic Ono Band	John Lennon; Yoko Ono; Phil Spector	1970	
"God Save Oz"	John Lennon; Yoko Ono	John Lennon Anthology	Yoko Ono; Rob Stevens	1998	
"Going Down on Love"	John Lennon	Walls and Bridges	John Lennon	1974	
"Goodnight Vienna"	John Lennon	John Lennon Anthology	Yoko Ono; Rob Stevens	1998	
"The Great Wok"	John Lennon	John Lennon Anthology	Yoko Ono; Rob Stevens	1998	
"Grow Old with Me" #	John Lennon	Milk and Honey	John Lennon; Yoko Ono	1984	
"Happy Xmas (War Is Over)" (John & Yoko/Plastic Ono Band with the Harlem Community Choir)	John Lennon; Yoko Ono	Non-album single	Phil Spector; John Lennon; Yoko Ono	1971	
"Hard Times are Over" #	Yoko Ono †	Double Fantasy	John Lennon; Yoko Ono; Jack Douglas	1980	
"Help Me to Help Myself" #	John Lennon	Double Fantasy (2000 reissue)	John Lennon; Yoko Ono; Jack Douglas	2000	
"Here We Go Again"	John Lennon; Phil Spector	Menlove Ave.	John Lennon; Phil Spector	1986	
"Hold On"	John Lennon	John Lennon/Plastic Ono Band	John Lennon; Yoko Ono; Phil Spector	1970	
"Honey Don't"	Carl Perkins †	John Lennon Signature Box	–	2010	
"Hound Dog" (live)	Jerry Leiber; Mike Stoller †	Live in New York City	Yoko Ono	1986	
"How?"	John Lennon	Imagine	John Lennon; Yoko Ono; Phil Spector	1971	
"How Do You Sleep?"	John Lennon	Imagine	John Lennon; Yoko Ono; Phil Spector	1971	
"I Don't Wanna Be a Soldier Mama"	John Lennon	Imagine	John Lennon; Yoko Ono; Phil Spector	1971	
"I Don't Wanna Face It" #	John Lennon	Milk and Honey	John Lennon; Yoko Ono	1984	
"I Found Out"	John Lennon	John Lennon/Plastic Ono Band	John Lennon; Yoko Ono; Phil Spector	1970	
"I Know (I Know)"	John Lennon	Mind Games	John Lennon	1973	
"I Saw Her Standing There" (live)	John Lennon; Paul McCartney	Lennon	–	1990	
"I'm Losing You" #	John Lennon	Double Fantasy	John Lennon; Yoko Ono; Jack Douglas	1980	
"I'm Moving On" #	Yoko Ono †	Double Fantasy	John Lennon; Yoko Ono; Jack Douglas	1980	
"I'm Stepping Out" #	John Lennon	Milk and Honey	John Lennon; Yoko Ono	1984	
"I'm the Greatest"	John Lennon	John Lennon Anthology	Yoko Ono; Rob Stevens	1998	
"I'm Your Angel" #	Yoko Ono †	Double Fantasy	John Lennon; Yoko Ono; Jack Douglas	1980	
"Imagine"	John Lennon; Yoko Ono (Note: Ono was added as a co-writer of "Imagine" in 2017.)	Imagine	John Lennon; Yoko Ono; Phil Spector	1971	
"Instant Karma!"	John Lennon	Non-album single	Phil Spector	1970	
"India, India"	John Lennon	John Lennon Signature Box	–	2010	
"Intuition"	John Lennon	Mind Games	John Lennon	1973	
"Isolation"	John Lennon	John Lennon/Plastic Ono Band	John Lennon; Yoko Ono; Phil Spector	1970	
"It's Real"	John Lennon	John Lennon Anthology	Yoko Ono; Rob Stevens	1998	
"It's So Hard"	John Lennon	Imagine	John Lennon; Yoko Ono; Phil Spector	1971	
"Jamrag" (live) # (with the Mothers of Invention)	John Lennon; Yoko Ono	Some Time in New York City	John Lennon; Yoko Ono; Phil Spector	1972	
"Jealous Guy"	John Lennon	Imagine	John Lennon; Yoko Ono; Phil Spector	1971	
"John & Yoko" #	John Lennon; Yoko Ono	Wedding Album	John Lennon; Yoko Ono	1969	
"John Sinclair" # (with Elephant's Memory)	John Lennon	Some Time in New York City	John Lennon; Yoko Ono; Phil Spector	1972	
"Just Because"	Lloyd Price †	Rock 'n' Roll	Phil Spector	1975	
"(Just Like) Starting Over" #	John Lennon	Double Fantasy	John Lennon; Yoko Ono; Jack Douglas	1980	
"A Kiss Is Just a Kiss"	Herman Hupfeld †	John Lennon Anthology	Yoko Ono; Rob Stevens	1998	
"Kiss Kiss Kiss" #	Yoko Ono †	Double Fantasy	John Lennon; Yoko Ono; Jack Douglas	1980	
"Let Me Count the Ways" #	Yoko Ono †	Milk and Honey	John Lennon; Yoko Ono	1984	
"Life Begins at 40"	John Lennon	John Lennon Anthology	Yoko Ono; Rob Stevens	1998	
"Long Lost John"	Traditional arr. John Lennon	John Lennon Anthology	Yoko Ono; Rob Stevens	1998	
"Look at Me"	John Lennon	John Lennon/Plastic Ono Band	John Lennon; Yoko Ono; Phil Spector	1970	
"Love"	John Lennon	John Lennon/Plastic Ono Band	John Lennon; Yoko Ono; Phil Spector	1970	
"The Luck of the Irish" # (with Elephant's Memory)	John Lennon; Yoko Ono	Some Time in New York City	John Lennon; Yoko Ono; Phil Spector	1972	
"Lucy in the Sky with Diamonds" (live)	John Lennon; Paul McCartney	Lennon	–	1990	
"Maggie Mae"	Traditional arr. John Lennon; Paul McCartney; George Harrison; Ringo Starr	John Lennon Anthology	Yoko Ono; Rob Stevens	1998	
"Meat City"	John Lennon	Mind Games	John Lennon	1973	
"Medley: Bring It On Home to Me/Send Me Some Lovin'"	Sam Cooke; John Marascalco; Leo Price †	Rock 'n' Roll	John Lennon	1975	
"Medley: Rip It Up/Ready Teddy"	Robert Blackwell; John Marascalco †	Rock 'n' Roll	John Lennon	1975	
"Mind Games"	John Lennon	Mind Games	John Lennon	1973	
"Money (That's What I Want)" (live) (Plastic Ono Band)	Janie Bradford; Berry Gordy †	Live Peace in Toronto 1969	John Lennon; Yoko Ono	1969	
"Mother"	John Lennon	John Lennon/Plastic Ono Band	John Lennon; Yoko Ono; Phil Spector	1970	
"Move Over Ms. L"	John Lennon	Non-album single (B-side to "Stand by Me")	John Lennon	1975	
"Mr. Hyde's Gone (Don't Be Afraid)"	John Lennon	John Lennon Anthology	Yoko Ono; Rob Stevens	1998	
"Mucho Mungo"	John Lennon	John Lennon Anthology	Yoko Ono; Rob Stevens	1998	
"My Baby Left Me"	Arthur Crudup †	Menlove Ave.	John Lennon; Phil Spector	1986	
"My Life"	John Lennon	John Lennon Anthology	Yoko Ono; Rob Stevens	1998	
"My Mummy's Dead"	John Lennon	John Lennon/Plastic Ono Band	John Lennon; Yoko Ono; Phil Spector	1970	
"New York City" # (with Elephant's Memory)	John Lennon	Some Time in New York City	John Lennon; Yoko Ono; Phil Spector	1972	
"No Bed for Beatle John" #	John Lennon; Yoko Ono	Unfinished Music No. 2: Life with the Lions	John Lennon; Yoko Ono	1969	
"Nobody Loves You (When You're Down and Out)"	John Lennon	Walls and Bridges	John Lennon	1974	
"Nobody Told Me" #	John Lennon	Milk and Honey	John Lennon; Yoko Ono	1984	
"Now and Then" (demo)	John Lennon	–		– (Note: Recorded as a demo in 1979)	
"Nutopian International Anthem" (Note: Consists of three seconds of silence)	John Lennon	Mind Games	John Lennon	1973	
"O' Sanity" #	Yoko Ono †	Milk and Honey	John Lennon; Yoko Ono	1984	
"Oh My Love"	John Lennon; Yoko Ono	Imagine	John Lennon; Yoko Ono; Phil Spector	1971	
"Oh Yoko!"	John Lennon	Imagine	John Lennon; Yoko Ono; Phil Spector	1971	
"Old Dirt Road"	John Lennon; Harry Nilsson	Walls and Bridges	John Lennon	1974	
"One Day (At a Time)"	John Lennon	Mind Games	John Lennon	1973	
"One of the Boys"	John Lennon	John Lennon Signature Box	–	2010	
"Only People"	John Lennon	Mind Games	John Lennon	1973	
"Only You"	Buck Ram †	John Lennon Anthology	Yoko Ono; Rob Stevens	1998	
"Open Your Box" (Yoko Ono/Plastic Ono Band)	Yoko Ono †	Non-album single (B-side to "Power to the People")	John Lennon; Yoko Ono	1971	
"Out the Blue"	John Lennon	Mind Games	John Lennon	1973	
"Peggy Sue"	Jerry Allison; Norman Petty; Buddy Holly †	Rock 'n' Roll	John Lennon	1975	
"Power to the People" (John Lennon/Plastic Ono Band)	John Lennon	Non-album single	Phil Spector; John Lennon; Yoko Ono	1971	
"Radio Play" #	John Lennon; Yoko Ono	Unfinished Music No. 2: Life with the Lions	John Lennon; Yoko Ono	1969	
"Real Love"	John Lennon	Imagine: John Lennon (soundtrack)	John Lennon	1988	
"Remember"	John Lennon	John Lennon/Plastic Ono Band	John Lennon; Yoko Ono; Phil Spector	1970	
"The Rishi Kesh Song"	John Lennon	John Lennon Anthology	Yoko Ono; Rob Stevens	1998	
"Rock and Roll People"	John Lennon	Menlove Ave.	John Lennon; Phil Spector	1986	
"Satire 1"	John Lennon	John Lennon Anthology	Yoko Ono; Rob Stevens	1998	
"Satire 2"	John Lennon	John Lennon Anthology	Yoko Ono; Rob Stevens	1998	
"Satire 3"	John Lennon	John Lennon Anthology	Yoko Ono; Rob Stevens	1998	
"Scared"	John Lennon	Walls and Bridges	John Lennon	1974	
"Scumbag" (live) # (with the Mothers of Invention)	John Lennon; Yoko Ono; Frank Zappa	Some Time in New York City	John Lennon; Yoko Ono; Phil Spector	1972	
"Serve Yourself"	John Lennon	John Lennon Anthology	Yoko Ono; Rob Stevens	1998	
"Sisters, O Sisters" # (with Elephant's Memory)	Yoko Ono †	Some Time in New York City	John Lennon; Yoko Ono; Phil Spector	1972	
"Sleepless Night" #	Yoko Ono †	Milk and Honey	John Lennon; Yoko Ono	1984	
"Slippin' and Slidin'"	Eddie Bo; Albert Collins; Little Richard; James Smith †	Rock 'n' Roll	John Lennon	1975	
"Stand by Me"	Jerry Leiber; Mike Stoller; Ben E. King †	Rock 'n' Roll	John Lennon	1975	
"Steel and Glass"	John Lennon	Walls and Bridges	John Lennon	1974	
"Stranger's Room"	John Lennon	John Lennon Anthology	Yoko Ono; Rob Stevens	1998	
"Sunday Bloody Sunday" # (with Elephant's Memory)	John Lennon; Yoko Ono	Some Time in New York City	John Lennon; Yoko Ono; Phil Spector	1972	
"Surprise, Surprise (Sweet Bird of Paradox)"	John Lennon	Walls and Bridges	John Lennon	1974	
"Sweet Little Sixteen"	Chuck Berry †	Rock 'n' Roll	Phil Spector	1975	
"Tight A$"	John Lennon	Mind Games	John Lennon	1973	
"To Know Her Is to Love Her"	Phil Spector †	Menlove Ave.	John Lennon; Phil Spector	1986	
"Two Minutes Silence" #	John Lennon; Yoko Ono	Unfinished Music No. 2: Life with the Lions	John Lennon; Yoko Ono	1969	
"Two Virgins Side One" #	John Lennon; Yoko Ono	Unfinished Music No. 1: Two Virgins	John Lennon; Yoko Ono	1968	
"Two Virgins Side Two" #	John Lennon; Yoko Ono	Unfinished Music No. 1: Two Virgins	John Lennon; Yoko Ono	1968	
"Walking on Thin Ice" (Note: The final song Lennon recorded on 8 December 1980 – the day of his murder) (Yoko Ono)	Yoko Ono †	Non-album single	John Lennon; Yoko Ono; Jack Douglas	1981	
"Watching the Wheels" #	John Lennon	Double Fantasy	John Lennon; Yoko Ono; Jack Douglas	1980	
"Well (Baby Please Don't Go)" (live) # (with the Mothers of Invention)	Walter Ward †	Some Time in New York City	John Lennon; Yoko Ono; Phil Spector	1972	
"Well Well Well"	John Lennon	John Lennon/Plastic Ono Band	John Lennon; Yoko Ono; Phil Spector	1970	
"We're All Water" # (with Elephant's Memory)	Yoko Ono †	Some Time in New York City	John Lennon; Yoko Ono; Phil Spector	1972	
"What You Got"	John Lennon	Walls and Bridges	John Lennon	1974	
"Whatever Gets You thru the Night"	John Lennon	Walls and Bridges	John Lennon	1974	
"Woman" #	John Lennon	Double Fantasy	John Lennon; Yoko Ono; Jack Douglas	1980	
"Woman Is the Nigger of the World" # (with Elephant's Memory)	John Lennon; Yoko Ono	Some Time in New York City	John Lennon; Yoko Ono; Phil Spector	1972	
"Working Class Hero"	John Lennon	John Lennon/Plastic Ono Band	John Lennon; Yoko Ono; Phil Spector	1970	
"Ya Ya" (Note: Another version of "Ya Ya" appears on Rock 'n' Roll. This version was released as a single.)	Morgan Robinson; Lee Dorsey; Clarence Lewis; Morris Levy †	Walls and Bridges	John Lennon	1974	
"Yer Blues" (live) (Plastic Ono Band)	John Lennon; Paul McCartney	Live Peace in Toronto 1969	John Lennon; Yoko Ono	1969	
"Yesterday" (parody)	John Lennon; Paul McCartney	John Lennon Anthology	Yoko Ono; Rob Stevens	1998	
"You Are Here"	John Lennon	Mind Games	John Lennon	1973	
"You Can't Catch Me"	Chuck Berry †	Rock 'n' Roll	Phil Spector	1975	
"You're the One" #	Yoko Ono †	Milk and Honey	Yoko Ono	1984	
"Your Hands" #	Yoko Ono †	Milk and Honey	John Lennon; Yoko Ono	1984	

== Bibliography ==
- Blaney, John (2005). John Lennon: Listen to This Book (illustrated ed.). [S.l.]: Paper Jukebox. ISBN 978-0-9544528-1-0.
- Du Noyer, Paul (1999). John Lennon: Whatever Gets You Through the Night. Thunder's Mouth Press. ISBN 978-1-5602-5210-8.
- Du Noyer, Paul (2010). John Lennon: The Stories Behind Every Song 1970–1980 (Rev. ed.). London: Carlton Books Ltd. ISBN 978-1-84732-665-2.
- Everett, Walter (1999). The Beatles As Musicians: Revolver through the Anthology. New York: Oxford University Press. ISBN 978-0-19-512941-0.
- Kane, Larry (2005). Lennon Revealed. Philadelphia: Running Press. ISBN 978-0-7624-2364-4.
- Schaffner, Nicholas (1978). The Beatles Forever. New York, NY: McGraw-Hill. ISBN 978-0-07-055087-2.
- Wenner, Jann (2010) [2004]. 500 Greatest Songs of All Time. OCLC 641731526.
