= Gimme Some Truth. The Ultimate Mixes =

Compilation album by John Lennon
- Released: 9 October 2020
- Recorded: September 1969 – December 1980
- Genre: Rock
- Length: 72:03 (single disc CD); 137:49 (2-disc CD)
- Label: Capitol/UMG
- Producer: Yoko Ono and Sean Lennon

John Lennon chronology
Icon (2014)	Gimme Some Truth. The Ultimate Mixes (2020)	Power to the People (2025)

Professional ratings
Review scores
Source	Rating
AllMusic	3.5/5 stars

Gimme Some Truth. The Ultimate Mixes is a compilation album of music recorded by John Lennon over the course of his solo career, each song remixed from new transfers of the original tracks. It was released on 9 October 2020, on what would have been Lennon's 80th birthday. The set was executive produced by Yoko Ono and produced by Sean Lennon.

== Background ==
Gimme Some Truth. The Ultimate Mixes was produced by the team consisting of production manager Simon Hilton, mixer, engineer, and producer Paul Hicks, and mix engineer and producer Sam Gannon—with direction from Yoko Ono and Sean Ono Lennon as the producer and creative director, respectively. The majority of the original tapes from the vault at Abbey Road and New York were digitised at Henson Recording Studios in Los Angeles.

The track selection of the two-disc edition is similar to the earlier compilation Working Class Hero: The Definitive Lennon, with the tracks "How Do You Sleep?", "Angela", "I Know (I Know)", "Steel and Glass", "Angel Baby", "Dear Yoko" and "Every Man Has a Woman Who Loves Him" replacing "Mother", "Woman is the Nigger of the World", "New York City", "You Are Here", "Intuition", "Scared", "Nobody Loves You (When You're Down and Out)", "Borrowed Time" and "Real Love". It also organises the tracks in largely chronological order, better reflecting the progression of Lennon's post-Beatles career.

== Artwork and packaging ==
The cover art and supplemental materials were designed by Jonathan Barnbrook. The cover features a profile black and white photo of Lennon, taken the day he returned his MBE.

The versions of the album include a 19-track version (1 CD, or 2LPs), a 36-track version (2 CDs, 4 12" LPs, or 9 10" LPs), and additional 2 CDs + Blu-Ray with a 124-page book.

== Track listing ==
All songs were written by John Lennon, except where noted.

=== 36-track version ===
Disc 1
No.	Title	Writer(s)	Original release	Length
1.	"Instant Karma! (We All Shine On)"		single, 1970	3:22
2.	"Cold Turkey"		single, 1969	5:01
3.	"Working Class Hero"		John Lennon/Plastic Ono Band, 1970	3:47
4.	"Isolation"		John Lennon/Plastic Ono Band, 1970	2:52
5.	"Love"		John Lennon/Plastic Ono Band, 1970	3:21
6.	"God"		John Lennon/Plastic Ono Band, 1970	4:11
7.	"Power to the People"		single, 1971	3:23
8.	"Imagine"	Lennon/Ono	Imagine, 1971	3:02
9.	"Jealous Guy"		Imagine, 1971	4:10
10.	"Gimme Some Truth"		Imagine, 1971	3:15
11.	"Oh My Love"	Lennon/Ono	Imagine, 1971	2:43
12.	"How Do You Sleep?"		Imagine, 1971	5:35
13.	"Oh Yoko!"		Imagine, 1971	4:16
14.	"Angela"	Lennon/Ono	Some Time in New York City, 1972	4:05
15.	"Come Together" (live)	Lennon/Paul McCartney	Live in New York City, 1986 (recorded 1972)	4:17
16.	"Mind Games"		Mind Games, 1973	4:11
17.	"Out the Blue"		Mind Games, 1973	3:21
18.	"I Know (I Know)"		Mind Games, 1973	3:50
Total length:				68:42

Disc 2
No.	Title	Writer(s)	Original release	Length
1.	"Whatever Gets You thru the Night"		Walls and Bridges, 1974	3:27
2.	"Bless You"		Walls and Bridges, 1974	4:38
3.	"#9 Dream"		Walls and Bridges, 1974	4:46
4.	"Steel and Glass"		Walls and Bridges, 1974	4:39
5.	"Stand by Me"	Ben E. King, Jerry Leiber, Mike Stoller	Rock 'n' Roll, 1975	3:31
6.	"Angel Baby"	Rosie Hamlin	Menlove Ave., 1986 (recorded 1973)	3:41
7.	"(Just Like) Starting Over"		Double Fantasy, 1980	3:55
8.	"I'm Losing You"		Double Fantasy, 1980	3:59
9.	"Beautiful Boy (Darling Boy)"		Double Fantasy, 1980	4:02
10.	"Watching the Wheels"		Double Fantasy, 1980	3:33
11.	"Woman"		Double Fantasy, 1980	3:32
12.	"Dear Yoko"		Double Fantasy, 1980	2:34
13.	"Every Man Has a Woman Who Loves Him"	Ono	Every Man Has a Woman, 1984 (recorded 1980)	3:18
14.	"Nobody Told Me"		Milk and Honey, 1984	3:34
15.	"I'm Stepping Out"		Milk and Honey, 1984	4:05
16.	"Grow Old with Me"		Milk and Honey, 1984/John Lennon Anthology, 1998	3:21
17.	"Happy Xmas (War Is Over)"	Lennon/Ono	single, 1971	3:33
18.	"Give Peace a Chance"		single, 1969	4:54
Total length:				69:02

=== 19-track version ===
Gimme Some Truth 19-track version
No.	Title	Length
1.	"Instant Karma! (We All Shine On)"	3.22
2.	"Cold Turkey"	5:02
3.	"Isolation"	2:52
4.	"Power to the People"	3:22
5.	"Imagine"	3:02
6.	"Jealous Guy"	4.10
7.	"Gimme Some Truth"	3.14
8.	"Come Together (Live)"	4:17
9.	"#9 Dream"	4:45
10.	"Mind Games"	4:10
11.	"Whatever Gets You Thru the Night"	3:27
12.	"Stand by Me"	3:31
13.	"(Just Like) Starting Over"	3:55
14.	"Beautiful Boy (Darling Boy)"	4:01
15.	"Watching the Wheels"	3:31
16.	"Woman"	3:31
17.	"Grow Old with Me"	3:19
18.	"Happy Xmas (War Is Over)"	3:32
19.	"Give Peace a Chance"	4:53
Total length:		72:03

=== Blu-Ray Audio disc ===
All thirty-six tracks in high definition audio repeated as:

1. HD Stereo Audio Mixes (24-bit/96 kHz)
2. HD 5.1 Surround Sound Mixes (24-bit/96 kHz)
3. HD Dolby Atmos Mixes

== Charts ==
Chart performance for Gimme Some Truth
Chart (2020)	Peak position
Australian Albums (ARIA)	61
Austrian Albums (Ö3 Austria)	4
Belgian Albums (Ultratop Flanders)	12
Belgian Albums (Ultratop Wallonia)	14
Canadian Albums (Billboard)	50
Czech Albums (ČNS IFPI)	16
Dutch Albums (Album Top 100)	22
German Albums (Offizielle Top 100)	6
Irish Albums (IRMA)	10
Polish Albums (ZPAV)	45
Portuguese Albums (AFP)	24
Spanish Albums (Promusicae)	100
Swiss Albums (Schweizer Hitparade)	10
UK Albums (OCC)	3
US Billboard 200	40
US Top Rock Albums (Billboard)	5

== Certifications ==
Certifications for Gimme Some Truth
Region	Certification	Certified units/sales
United Kingdom (BPI)	Gold	100,000^{‡}
^{‡} Sales+streaming figures based on certification alone.
