= You Are Here (song) =

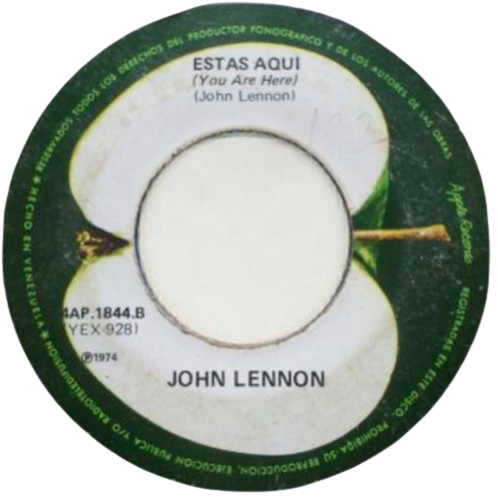
- Label from the Venezuelan single, released in 1974 with "Bring On the Lucie (Freda Peeple)" as the A-side

Song by John Lennon

from the album Mind Games
- Published: Lenono Music
- Released: 16 November 1973
- Recorded: 1973
- Length: 4:08
- Label: Apple
- Songwriter: John Lennon
- Producer: John Lennon

Mind Games track listing
- 12 tracks Side one: 1. "Mind Games"; 2. "Tight A$"; 3. "Aisumasen (I'm Sorry)"; 4. "One Day (At a Time)"; 5. "Bring on the Lucie (Freeda Peeple)"; 6. "Nutopian International Anthem"; Side two: 7. "Intuition"; 8. "Out the Blue"; 9. "Only People"; 10. "I Know (I Know)"; 11. "You Are Here"; 12. "Meat City"

"You Are Here" is a song written and performed by John Lennon from his 1973 album Mind Games.

== Music and lyrics ==
"You Are Here" was written by John Lennon expressing his love for his wife Yoko Ono. Lennon played vocals, acoustic guitar, and percussion for the track with David Spinozza on electric guitar, Gordon Edwards on bass, Jim Keltner on drums, Kenneth Ascher on keyboards, Sneaky Pete Kleinow on pedal steel guitar, and female vocal group Something Different as vocal backup. According to Matt Friedlander of American Songwriter, the song is a love ballad that has a "breezy island feel". The staff of Goldmine magazine said "You Are Here" is a "tranquil, poetic song with heartfelt lyrics about their love".

== Reception ==
Beatle biographer John Blaney described the concept of the song as combining two of Lennon's favorite themes, peace and love. Blaney wrote that although it is primarily a love song to Yoko Ono, it is also "about the coming together of individuals, countries and cultures," using his relationship with Ono as a model. Blaney claimed that "The global harmony [Lennon] envisions is as graceful and beatific as the melody he fashioned to support the words." Music lecturers Ben Urish and Ken Bielen wrote that "the song drifts pleasantly along as steel guitar gives it an alternatively South Seas and then country and western ambiance. On the other hand, music journalist Paul du Noyer felt that Lennon's "strong feelings did not inspire a vivid song", calling the imagery "hackneyed" and the musical exotica "trite". Music critic Johnny Rogan considered the song to be "the grand symbol of [Lennon's] immemorial, romantic love."

== Music video ==
In June 2024, a music video was released for the remix of the song featuring previously unreleased footage directed by Lennon and filmed by William Wareing and Dick Lorriemore. The video shows a 27-year-old Lennon on 30 June 1968 accompanied by Robert Fraser, Derek Taylor, Neil Aspinall, Victor Spinetti, and their team as they finish setting up Lennon's debut art exhibit, You Are Here (To Yoko From John Lennon, With Love).
