= Les Vierges du Québec =

Studio album by Jean-Pierre Ferland
- Released: 1974
- Genre: Folk/Rock
- Label: Jaune JF-7300

Jean-Pierre Ferland chronology
Soleil (1971)	Les Vierges du Québec (1974)	Le Showbusiness (1975)

Les Vierges du Québec is the twelfth studio album by Canadian Singer/Songwriter Jean-Pierre Ferland, released in 1974, and is part of a trilogy started in 1970 with his album Jaune and followed by Soleil in 1971.

== Track list ==
All tracks by Jean-Pierre Ferland & Jean-Pierre Lauzon

1. "Qu'est-ce que ça peut ben faire" – 4:20
2. "Women's Lib (1919)" – 3:41
3. "Les Vierges du Québec" – 6:25
4. "Simone" – 4:09
5. "Sniff... Sniff..." – 0:50
6. "Isabelle" – 2:37
7. "Le Motel Alfred" – 5:17
8. "T'es mon amour, t'es ma maîtresse" – 2:23
9. "Bonsoir madame" – 2:15

== Personnel ==
=== Band ===
- Jean-Pierre Ferland – Arranger, Vocals, Lyricist, Producer
- Tomi Lee Bradley – Arranger, Backing Vocals, Voices
- Luis Cabaza – Synthesizer, Piano, Arranger
- J.P. Lauzon – Organ, Guitar, Arranger, Double Bass
- Richard Provençal – Percussion, Arranger, Drums, Triangle
- Bob Segarini – Backing vocals
- Randy Bishop - Backing vocals

=== Production ===
- Nick Blagona – Engineer, Mixing
- Claude Demers – Engineer
