= Michel Robidoux =

Canadian musician (1943–2021)

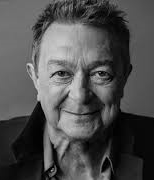
- Robidoux in 2017
- Born: 10 July 1943; East Angus, Quebec, Canada
- Died: 31 October 2021 (aged 78)
- Occupation: Musician

Michel Robidoux (10 July 1943 – 31 October 2021) was a Canadian musician.

== Biography ==
Michel was the son of fellow musicians Fernand Robidoux and Jeanne Couët. He learned to play multiple musical instruments and played at the show L'Osstidcho alongside Robert Charlebois, Yvon Deschamps, Louise Forestier, and Claudine Monfette. He also composed music on the Jean-Pierre Ferland album Jaune. He then arranged two songs on the Leonard Cohen album I'm Your Man. He was known for his contributions to the music on the children's television series Passe-Partout.

In March 2017, Robidoux released the album Robidoux Premier, which became a great success. It featured musicians such as Pierre Lapointe, Alex Nevsky, Bïa Krieger, Catherine Major, Ariane Moffatt, and Daniel Bélanger.

Michel Robidoux died on 31 October 2021, at the age of 78.

== Distinctions ==
- Félix Award (1982–2003)
- Prix François-Cousineau of the Society of Composers, Authors and Music Publishers of Canada (2006)
