= Icon (John Lennon album) =

Compilation album by John Lennon
- Released: 9 September 2014
- Genre: Rock
- Label: Apple, Capitol

John Lennon chronology
John Lennon Signature Box (2010)	Icon (2014)	Gimme Some Truth. The Ultimate Mixes (2020)

Icon is a compilation album by John Lennon, released in 2014. It is part of the budget line Icon album series issued by Universal Music Enterprises since 2010.

The album's closing track, "Give Peace a Chance", lists John Lennon and Yoko Ono as writers for the first time, continuing the evolution of songwriting credits for this song, which began as Lennon-McCartney when originally issued as a single in 1969 and then changed to Lennon alone after the Lennon Legend: The Very Best of John Lennon compilation in 1997.

== Track listing ==
1. "Imagine"
2. "(Just Like) Starting Over"
3. "Instant Karma!"
4. "Stand by Me"
5. "Watching the Wheels"
6. "Mind Games"
7. "Jealous Guy"
8. "Beautiful Boy (Darling Boy)"
9. "Love"
10. "Happy Xmas (War Is Over)"
11. "Give Peace a Chance"

== Chart performance ==
Chart (2015)	Peak position
Canadian Albums (Billboard)	16
Italian Albums (Musica e dischi)	47

== Certifications ==
Certifications for Icon
Region	Certification	Certified units/sales
Canada (Music Canada)	Gold	40,000^{^}
^{^} Shipments figures based on certification alone.
