= Nutopia =

Conceptual country founded by John Lennon and Yoko Ono

Nutopia is a conceptual country, sometimes referred to as a micronation, founded by John Lennon and Yoko Ono. One of the reasons that the country was founded was to address Lennon's then-ongoing immigration problems (the previous week he received a deportation order) through satirical means.

There is no leadership and not all citizenships have been recorded. As a result, the population is unknown.

Nutopia is a portmanteau of "new" and "utopia" which suggests Nutopia is a new, utopian society. There is also the word play with "nut" (slang word for an insane person) and "utopia".

== History ==
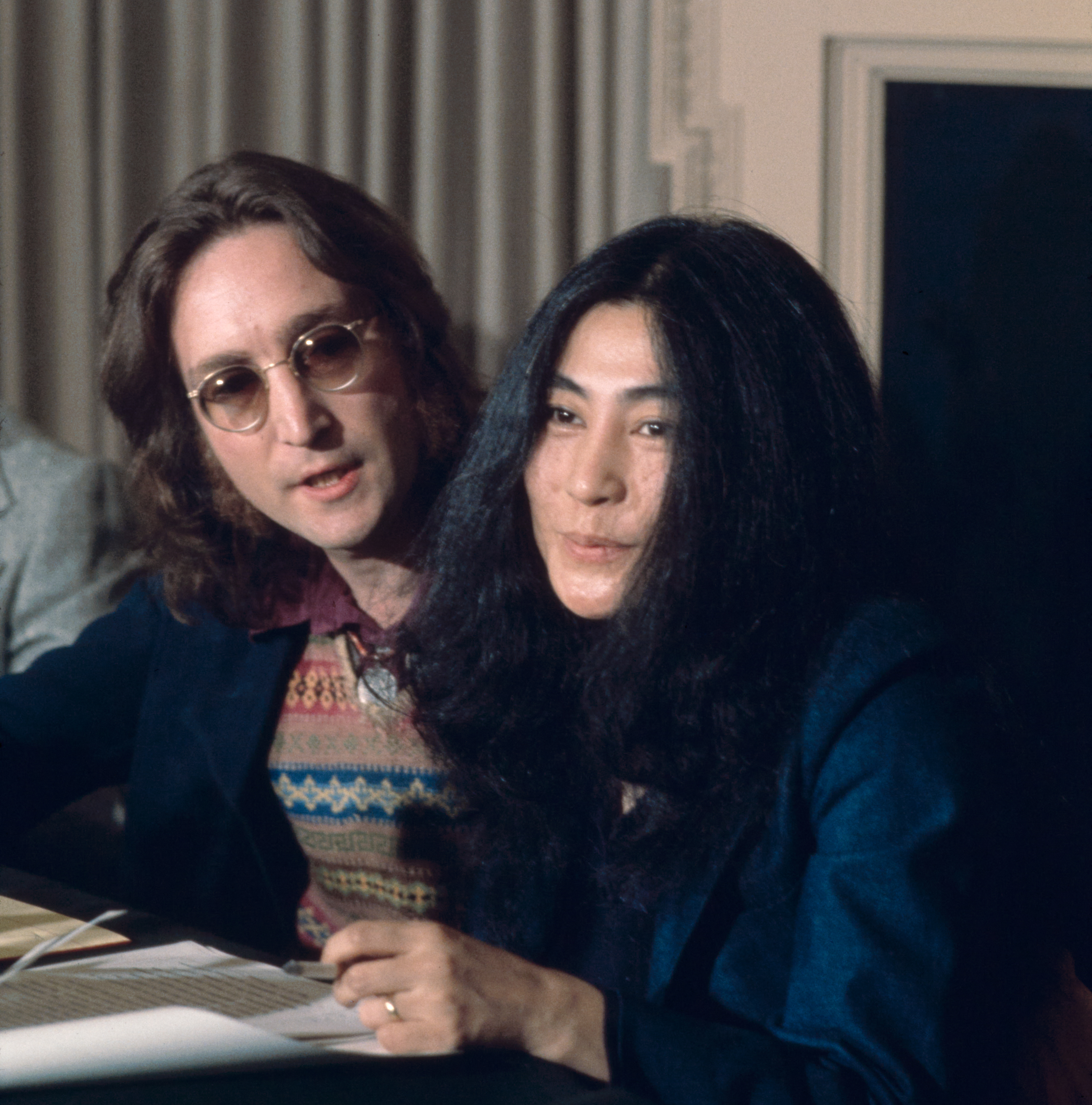
Lennon and Ono at the press conference where they announced the formation of Nutopia.

On 2 April 1973 Lennon and Ono introduced the conceptual country of Nutopia at a press conference in New York City.

Lennon and Ono declared themselves ambassadors of the country and sought diplomatic immunity to end Lennon's ongoing immigration troubles as he and Ono tried to remain in the United States. (Ono already had a Resident Alien "green card" through her previous husband, Tony Cox. Lennon had been denied permanent residence status.) Lennon talked about the imaginary country, which would live up to the ideals of his songs "Imagine" and "Mind Games", saying this in the "official" declaration, signed the day before:

We announce the birth of a conceptual country, NUTOPIA.
Citizenship of the country can be obtained by declaration of your awareness of NUTOPIA.
NUTOPIA has no land, no boundaries, no passports, only people.
NUTOPIA has no laws other than cosmic.
All people of NUTOPIA are ambassadors of the country.
As two ambassadors of NUTOPIA, we ask for diplomatic immunity and recognition in the United Nations of our country and its people.

The Nutopian Embassy was originally located at 1 White Street in the Tribeca neighborhood of Manhattan which was the apartment address for some their friends and staff (Ken Dewey, Jon Hendricks, Patty Oldenburg and Helen Seaman) and headquarters of the National Committee for John and Yoko, set up to help their immigration case. Lennon shortly moved this embassy to their Dakota apartment, affixing a gold plaque engraved 'NUTOPIAN EMBASSY' to their kitchen back door. Ono remarked decades later that guests preferred walking into her home through that door instead of the front entrance.

== Symbols ==
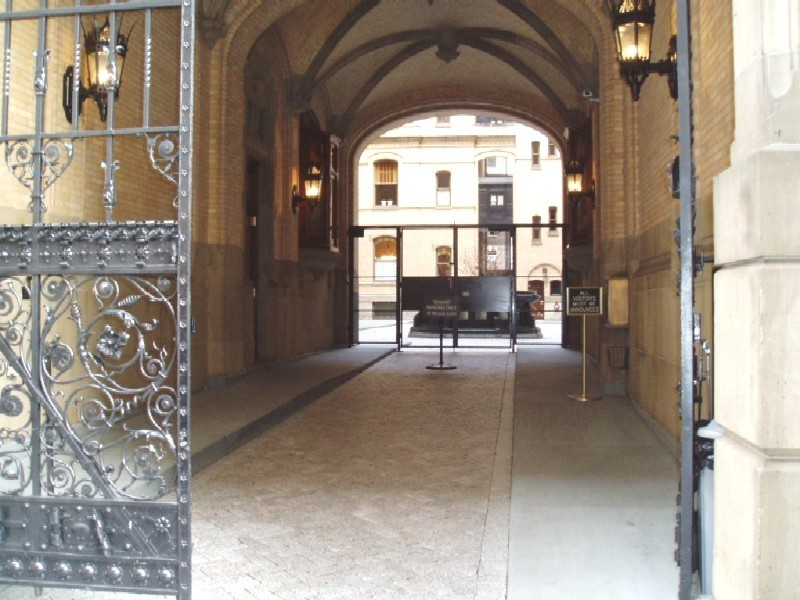
The entrance to the Dakota building, where Lennon and Ono posted a Nutopian Embassy sign on the back door of their apartment

The flag of Nutopia has only one colour: white. At the press conference Lennon, waving a white handkerchief, stated, "This is the flag of Nutopia—we surrender, to peace and to love". According to a reporter for The New York Times, Lennon blew his nose on the tissue. Some criticised this association with surrender, but Lennon and Ono defended the association, saying that only through surrender and compromise could peace be achieved.

Lennon's album Mind Games (1973) features the "Nutopian International Anthem", which consists of four seconds of silence.

The hand-drawn Great Seal of Nutopia features a picture of a seal balancing a yin-yang globe on its nose.

== Legacy ==
Lennon's deportation order was overturned in 1975. The following year, he received his green card, certifying his permanent residency.

In 2006, a Nutopia website was created that forwarded to a site about the documentary The U.S. vs. John Lennon, distributed by Lions Gate Entertainment.

Finnish singer-songwriter Kari Peitsamo, fan of Lennon's work, released a song called "Nutopia" on his album I'm Down.

In 2009 an exhibit in New York displayed the letter that established Nutopia.

Since April 2024, individuals have been able to declare their citizenship of Nutopia via a website. The call to join Nutopia was made through Yoko Ono’s account on X (formerly Twitter) and others.
