= Out the Blue (John Lennon song) =

Song by John Lennon

from the album Mind Games
- Released: 16 November 1973
- Recorded: July–August 1973
- Genre: Rock
- Length: 3:23
- Label: Apple
- Songwriter: John Lennon
- Producer: John Lennon

Mind Games track listing
- 12 tracks Side one: 1. "Mind Games"; 2. "Tight A$"; 3. "Aisumasen (I'm Sorry)"; 4. "One Day (At a Time)"; 5. "Bring on the Lucie (Freeda Peeple)"; 6. "Nutopian International Anthem"; Side two: 7. "Intuition"; 8. "Out the Blue"; 9. "Only People"; 10. "I Know (I Know)"; 11. "You Are Here"; 12. "Meat City"

"Out the Blue" is a song written by John Lennon and originally released on his 1973 album Mind Games. The song is included on the 1990 boxset Lennon, the 2005 two-disc compilation Working Class Hero: The Definitive Lennon, the 2010 album Gimme Some Truth and the 2020 compilation album Gimme Some Truth. The Ultimate Mixes.

== Lyrics and music ==
"Out the Blue" is one of several songs on Mind Games devoted to Yoko Ono. It was recorded at a time when Lennon and Ono were separated, and reflects Lennon's resulting self-doubt. It states Lennon's gratitude for Ono appearing in his life "out the blue" and providing his "life's energy". According to authors Ben Urish and Ken Bielen, the theme of the song is "the awe of finding true love unexpectedly".

Music critic Johnny Rogan finds some of the metaphors "gruesome", such as "All my life's been a long, slow knife", and some of the similes "wacky", for example "Like a UFO you came to me and blew away life's misery." Pop historian Robert Rodriguez regards the UFO line as "idiosyncratic" as well. Andrew Grant Jackson, however, finds the UFO metaphor to be apt for Ono, since at the time Ono came into Lennon's life she was as surprising a love interest for him as anyone could be. The UFO reference could be associated with May Pang as they saw a UFO together when they lived together. Urish and Bielen praise the "long, slow knife" image one of Lennon's most poetic of emotional anguish. The title phrase has multiple meanings during the song; Ono came to him "out the blue" and also cast "out the blue" of Lennon's melancholy.

"Out the Blue" moves through several musical genres, starting with a gentle, melancholy acoustic guitar and moving through gospel, country and music portions. The sound grows as the song progresses, while Lennon's vocal becomes more assured, going from its original restraint to an expression of "joyful contentment". After the initial acoustic guitar, the piano, pedal steel guitar, bass guitar and drums enter, and eventually a "heavenly choir" is included. Author John Blaney describes the song's piano motif as "majestic" and compares the bass guitar line to those of Lennon's former bandmate Paul McCartney. Rodriguez praises the way Lennon's vocal manages to "stay atop the waves" of sound, and project both gratitude and tenderness. Keith Spore of The Milwaukee Sentinel described it as having a "haunting minor key melody in the best Beatle tradition". Rolling Stone Magazine critic David Fricke praised the production as being "fascinating and moving", comparing it to Phil Spector's production of the Beatles' "The Long and Winding Road" but "with the emphasis on poignance".

The backing instrumental part for the final released version was cut down from the original recording, eliminating the second break as well as all but the final coda of the reprise of the refrain. The full recorded instrumental, with a guide vocal, was released as part of The Lost Lennon Tapes and on bootleg albums.

== Reception ==
AllMusic critic Stephen Thomas Erlewine considers "Out the Blue" to be a "lovely ballad", while Blaney describes it as "an exquisite ballad". Blaney goes on to say that "it reveals more than a glimpse of Lennon's genius." Mandinger and Easter call it a "truly beautiful love song" and feel it deserves more attention than it has received, and could have made a good follow up single to "Mind Games". They also claim that it shows Lennon had not lost his ability to put "the simplest emotions across in the most affecting manner possible". Jackson considers it the best of Lennon's apology songs to Ono. He particularly praises the arrangement, in which he maintains interest by building up the instrumentation gradually. Urish and Bielen opine that it delivers "a more satisfying emotional impact than might be supposed". Lennon biographer John Borack calls it a "highlight" of Mind Games. Los Angeles Times music critic Robert Hilburn calls it "one of the unquestioned highlights" of Mind Games, calling it a "lovely song" and praising its "tender, effective lyrics". PopMatters regards it as Lennon's "only lighter waving 70s monster ballad", and believes that it should be included on Lennon's greatest hits compilation albums. Pop historian Robert Rodriguez regards it as one of the "best unsung John" Lennon songs, one of Lennon's "finest performances" and one of his best "standard-worthy ballad(s)". Ultimate Classic Rock critic Nick DeRiso called "Out the Blue" the most underrated song on Mind Games, describing it as "a tale of once-devoted lovers now apart who somehow still seem destined to return to one another" and saying that it reveals how deep the loss of Ono was to Lennon while also foreshadowing their forthcoming reconciliation. Ultimate Classic Rock critic Stephen Lewis rated "Out the Blue" as Lennon's 6th greatest solo love song, saying that "Its ethereal acoustic opening verses, building to the emphatic chorus, combine to make it a perfect example of his state of mind in 1973." Ultimate Classic Rock critic Nick DeRiso rated the song as Lennon's 9th best "deep cut", saying that it provided a glimpse into his marital difficulties with Yoko Ono and stating that the string accompaniment sounded like a sadder, more honest version of [Phil] Spector's cloying arrangement for 'The Long and Winding Road.'"

== Personnel ==
The musicians who performed on the original recording were as follows:

- John Lennon – vocals, acoustic guitar, Clavinet, tambourine
- David Spinozza – acoustic guitar
- Pete Kleinow – pedal steel guitar
- Ken Ascher – pianos, reed organ
- Gordon Edwards – bass guitar
- Jim Keltner – drums
- Something Different (Christine Wiltshire, Jocelyn Brown, Kathy Mull, Angel Coakley) – backing vocals
