= Bring On the Lucie (Freda Peeple) =

"Bring on the Lucie (Freda Peeple)"
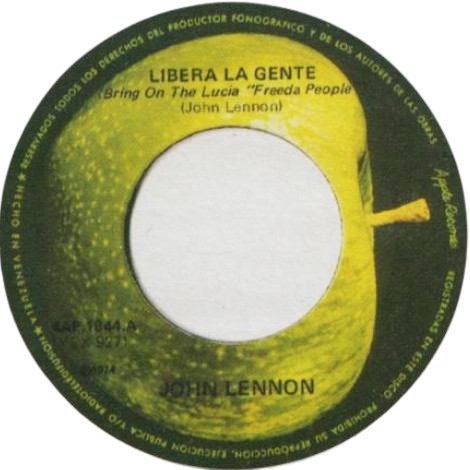
- 1974 Venezuelan single label

Song by John Lennon

from the album Mind Games
- Published: Lenono Music
- Released: 16 November 1973
- Recorded: 1973
- Genre: Rock
- Length: 4:12
- Label: Apple
- Songwriter: John Lennon
- Producer: John Lennon

Mind Games track listing
- 12 tracks Side one: 1. "Mind Games"; 2. "Tight A$"; 3. "Aisumasen (I'm Sorry)"; 4. "One Day (At a Time)"; 5. "Bring on the Lucie (Freeda Peeple)"; 6. "Nutopian International Anthem"; Side two: 7. "Intuition"; 8. "Out the Blue"; 9. "Only People"; 10. "I Know (I Know)"; 11. "You Are Here"; 12. "Meat City"

"Bring on the Lucie (Freda Peeple)" is a protest song written and performed by John Lennon from his 1973 album Mind Games.

== Background ==
The song dates from late 1971, starting out as little more than a chorus, after Lennon acquired a National guitar. After working on the lyrics, the song went from a simple political slogan to a full-blown statement that hints at his earlier work, such as "Imagine" and "Power to the People".

== Reception ==
Classic Rock critic Rob Hughes rated "Bring on the Lucie (Freda Peeple)" as Lennon's 7th best political song, praising Lennon's vocal performance and David Spinozza's guitar groove, saying that "this anti-Vietnam address also acts as a scathing rebuttal of self-seeking politics." Ultimate Classic Rock critic Nick DeRiso rated it as Lennon's 7th greatest solo political song, praising David Spinozza's slide guitar and saying that the song "eviscerates lying politicians while making an impassioned call (stop the killing!) for the end of the ongoing Vietnam conflict."

== In the media ==
Two versions of the song, both performed by Lennon, appear in the 2006 film Children of Men. The standard version of the song (originally released on the Mind Games album) is heard during the course of the film, and an alternate version of the song, originally released on the 1998 John Lennon Anthology boxed set, is featured over the closing credits. The John Lennon Anthology version of the song also appears on the film's soundtrack along with a cover version by Junior Parker of "Tomorrow Never Knows," a song Lennon wrote for the Beatles album Revolver.

The song is also played during the closing credits of the 2022 Judd Apatow HBO documentary George Carlin's American Dream.

== Personnel ==
Per Mind Games album booklet:

- John Lennon – vocals, acoustic guitar, electric guitar, maracas, tambourine
- Pete Kleinow – pedal steel guitar
- Ken Ascher – piano, electric piano
- Gordon Edwards – bass guitar
- Jim Keltner – drums, cowbell
- Rick Marotta – bongos
- Something Different (Christine Wiltshire, Jocelyn Brown, Kathy Mull, Angel Coakley) – backing vocals

== Covers ==
Julie Felix recorded a cover in 1980 on her album Colours in the Rain.

Richard Ashcroft released a cover of the song on 19 February 2021.
