= Aisumasen (I'm Sorry) =

1973 song by John Lennon

Song by John Lennon

from the album Mind Games
- Released: 16 November 1973
- Recorded: July–August 1973
- Genre: Soft Rock
- Length: 4:44
- Label: Apple
- Songwriter: John Lennon
- Producer: John Lennon

Mind Games track listing
- 12 tracks Side one: 1. "Mind Games"; 2. "Tight A$"; 3. "Aisumasen (I'm Sorry)"; 4. "One Day (At a Time)"; 5. "Bring on the Lucie (Freeda Peeple)"; 6. "Nutopian International Anthem"; Side two: 7. "Intuition"; 8. "Out the Blue"; 9. "Only People"; 10. "I Know (I Know)"; 11. "You Are Here"; 12. "Meat City"

"Aisumasen (I'm Sorry)" is a song written by John Lennon released on his 1973 album Mind Games. The song is included on the 1990 box set Lennon.

== Lyrics and music ==
The song's lyrics have Lennon apologising to wife Yoko Ono. Aisumasen is a corruption of the formal term sumimasen (すみません) which means "I'm sorry" in Japanese. The line "It's hard enough I know to feel your own pain" reprises a theme found in a line from Lennon's earlier song "I Found Out". After the lyrics run out, a guitar solo is played. Authors Ken Bielen and Ben Urish interpret this solo as a continuation of the plea for forgiveness. The solo ends abruptly, which Bielen and Urish suggest symbolises the rejection of Lennon's plea. In fact, by the time "Aisumasen (I'm Sorry)" was released, Lennon and Ono had separated. Author John Blaney agrees that the song implies that Lennon will not get the forgiveness and comfort he needs from Ono, and further states that the song reveals just how much he needed her.

"Aisumasen (I'm Sorry)" has some similarities to the Beatles song "I Want You (She's So Heavy)", which was also written by Lennon and inspired by Ono. Bielen and Urish claim that "Aisumasen (I'm Sorry)" has a similar rhythm to "a slowed down, semi-acoustic version" of "I Want You (She's So Heavy)". "I Want You (She's So Heavy)" also ends abruptly.

Lennon had been working on the melody to "Aisumasen (I'm Sorry)" since at least 1971. A demo of the song was recorded during sessions for Lennon's Imagine. Originally, the melody belonged to a song whose working title was "Call My Name", dating from a demo recorded in December 1971. In "Call My Name", Lennon was offering to comfort someone, but in the final version of the song, Lennon is the one asking for forgiveness. In "Call My Name", the melodic line that became "Aisumasen" was sung to the words "I'll ease your pain."

== Reception ==
Music critic Johnny Rogan finds the song to be "occasionally powerful" and feels it "brings some depth" to the Mind Games album. Keith Spore of The Milwaukee Sentinel called the song "a lovely ballad" which serves as a reminder of Lennon's past brilliance. Bielen and Urish consider it to be one of Mind Games' strongest songs, although they think it may have been even stronger had Lennon stuck to his original lyrical impulses of "Call My Name". PopMatters feels that the song starts out well, "like classic Lennon blues," but that Lennon "never finds the conviction to carry the song across the finish line."

Ultimate Classic Rock critic Stephen Lewis rated "Aisumasen (I'm Sorry)" as Lennon's 8th greatest solo love song, saying that Lennon's falsetto singing of the line "All that I know is just what you tell me / All that I know is just what you show me" is a highlight of the song.

== Personnel ==
The musicians who performed on the original recording were as follows:

- John Lennon – vocals, acoustic guitar, tambourine
- David Spinozza – electric guitars
- Pete Kleinow – pedal steel guitar
- Ken Ascher – pianos, organ
- Gordon Edwards – bass guitar
- Jim Keltner – drums
