= I Know (I Know) =

Song by John Lennon

from the album Mind Games
- Published: Lenono Music.
- Released: 16 November 1973
- Recorded: July–August 1973
- Genre: Rock
- Length: 3:49
- Label: Apple
- Songwriter: John Lennon
- Producer: John Lennon

Mind Games track listing
- 12 tracks Side one: 1. "Mind Games"; 2. "Tight A$"; 3. "Aisumasen (I'm Sorry)"; 4. "One Day (At a Time)"; 5. "Bring on the Lucie (Freeda Peeple)"; 6. "Nutopian International Anthem"; Side two: 7. "Intuition"; 8. "Out the Blue"; 9. "Only People"; 10. "I Know (I Know)"; 11. "You Are Here"; 12. "Meat City"

"I Know (I Know)" is a song written by John Lennon released on his 1973 album Mind Games. The song is included on the 1998 box set John Lennon Anthology and the 2020 compilation album Gimme Some Truth. The Ultimate Mixes.

== Music and lyrics ==
Lennon called the song "just a piece of nothing", though some have read the song as either a confession of troubles with his relationship with Yoko Ono or a message to former bandmate Paul McCartney. Beatle biographer John Blaney notes that the song has Lennon apologizing to Ono and acknowledging that he has a lot to learn. Music critic Paul du Noyer agrees that this is a song in which Lennon apologizes to Ono for his "unworthiness." Music lecturers Ben Urish and Ken Bielen say that the theme of the song is the way love is like a living thing that grows as it is nurtured and as the two people involved get to know each other and recognize how each views the other. Music critic Johnny Rogan noted that the song ends with a conclusion similar to that of Lennon's earlier song "God": that only his belief in his relationship with Ono is real.

Blaney points out that Lennon incorporates a "delicate guitar figure" he learned from Donovan into the song, which Blaney believes "gives 'I Know (I Know)' and honesty that enhances his plea for his lover's absolution." Du Noyer believes this guitar figure sounds like the Beatles. Lennon worked hard when overdubbing the song to develop the song's delicate arrangement.

British author Ian Leslie believes the song was addressed to Paul, writing in the New York Times: In “I Know (I Know),” Mr. Lennon sings, “Today, I love you more than yesterday,” over a riff based on their last direct songwriting collaboration, “I’ve Got a Feeling.”

== Reception ==
Du Noyer considered "I Know (I Know)" to be one of the "stronger ballads" on Mind Games. Urish and Bielen claim that it "stand out as lyrically superior to and expressing a more complex maturity than most of the songs on the album." Rogan similarly called it one of the best songs on the album, saying that "the emotional commitment, largely missing from other songs he recorded during this period, is clearly revealed here."

== Personnel ==
The musicians who performed on the original recording were as follows:

- John Lennon – vocals, acoustic guitars, tambourine
- David Spinozza – electric guitars
- Ken Ascher – piano, organ
- Gordon Edwards – bass guitar
- Jim Keltner – drums
- Michael Brecker – saxophones
