= Children of Men soundtracks =

Soundtracks for a film

Children of Men had two soundtracks for the film, a film score by British composer John Tavener, and a soundtrack with various popular music acts.

== Soundtrack ==
Children of Men Original Motion Picture Soundtrack

Soundtrack album by Various Artists
- Released: 30 October 2006
- Genres: Soundtracks; Rock; Pop; Hip hop
- Label: Hip-O
- Producer: Becca Gatrell

Professional ratings
Review scores
Source	Rating
Allmusic	3.5/5 stars

Several songs that are heard during the movie, such as "Total State Machine" by Test Dept, "Omgyjya Switch7" by Aphex Twin, "Anti War Dub" by Digital Mystikz, "War Dub" by Pinch and "Life in a Glasshouse" by Radiohead are not included on the soundtrack. Furthermore, the tracks "Map of the Problematique" by Muse, "Gimme Shelter" by The Rolling Stones, and "Hoppípolla" by Sigur Rós were used in TV spots and trailers but were not featured in the film. Pulp frontman Jarvis Cocker's song "Running the World" is played in the credits of the film.

=== Track listing ===
No.	Title	Writer(s)	Artist	Length
1.	"Hush"	Joe South	Deep Purple	4:25
2.	"Witness (1 Hope)"	Rodney Smith	Roots Manuva	4:14
3.	"Tomorrow Never Knows"	John Lennon, Paul McCartney	Junior Parker	3:30
4.	"Sleepy Shores"	Johnny Pearson	Michael Price	3:30
5.	"The Court of the Crimson King"	Ian McDonald, Peter Sinfield	King Crimson	4:49
6.	"Backward"	S. Goodman, S.G Gordon	Kode 9, Spaceape	4:33
7.	"Wait"	Jamie Hince, Alison Mosshart	The Kills	4:47
8.	"There Is an Ocean"	Donovan Leitch	Donovan	4:47
9.	"Ruby Tuesday"	Mick Jagger, Keith Richards	Franco Battiato	3:37
10.	"Money Honey"	Annette Henry, Kevin Martin	Pressure	3:46
11.	"Arbeit Macht Frei"	Pete Doherty	The Libertines	1:15
12.	"Indian Stomp"	J. Flynn	Cyrus	3:29
13.	"Bring on the Lucie (Freeda Peeple)"	John Lennon	John Lennon	4:13
14.	"Running the World"	Jarvis Cocker	Jarvis Cocker	4:43

== Fragments of a Prayer from the Motion Picture "Children of Men" ==
Fragments of a Prayer from the Motion Picture "Children of Men"

Film score by John Tavener
- Released: 12 December 2006
- Genre: Film score
- Label: Varèse Sarabande

Professional ratings
Review scores
Source	Rating
Soundtrack-Express	3.5/5 stars

The film score, entitled Fragments of a Prayer, was composed by John Tavener and released on Varèse Sarabande.

Director Alfonso Cuarón describes Tavener's Fragments of a Prayer as "a spiritual comment rather than a narrative support." The track features mezzo-soprano Sarah Connolly and is used as a powerful motif. Unlike most composers, Tavener chose not to score the piece to the film, but to the screenplay instead.

The poetry of William Blake is featured in the lyrics to Eternity's Sunrise, a work Tavener had previously written and dedicated to Princess Diana after her death.

=== Track listing ===
No.	Title	Writer(s)	Length
1.	"Fragments of a Prayer"	John Tavener	15:21
2.	"Eternity's Sunrise"	John Tavener	10:53
3.	"Alexander's Feast/War, He Sung, Is Toil and Trouble"	George Frideric Handel	4:44
4.	"Kindertotenlieder/Nun Will Die Sonn' So Hell Aufgeh'n"	Gustav Mahler	5:31
5.	"Threnody for the Victims of Hiroshima"	Krzysztof Penderecki	9:59
6.	"Song of the Angel"	John Tavener	4:35
7.	"The Lamb"	John Tavener	3:20
8.	"Mother and Child"	John Tavener	12:38
9.	"Mother of God, Here I Stand"	John Tavener	3:28
Total length:			70:31
