= Meat City =

1973 song by John Lennon

Single by John Lennon

from the album Mind Games
- A-side: "Mind Games"
- Released: 29 October 1973 (US); 16 November 1973 (UK)
- Recorded: July–August 1973
- Genre: Hard rock, glam rock
- Length: 2:45
- Label: Apple
- Songwriter: John Lennon
- Producer: John Lennon

Mind Games track listing
- 12 tracks Side one: 1. "Mind Games"; 2. "Tight A$"; 3. "Aisumasen (I'm Sorry)"; 4. "One Day (At a Time)"; 5. "Bring on the Lucie (Freeda Peeple)"; 6. "Nutopian International Anthem"; Side two: 7. "Intuition"; 8. "Out the Blue"; 9. "Only People"; 10. "I Know (I Know)"; 11. "You Are Here"; 12. "Meat City"

"Meat City" is a song written by John Lennon, released as the 12th and final track on his 1973 album Mind Games. The song is also the B-side of the single featuring the album's title track, and is included on the 2010 album, Gimme Some Truth.

== Lyrics & music ==
Lennon began to write "Meat City" soon after he moved to New York City. The song began as a boogie entitled "Shoeshine" but by late 1971 it began to take its final form, albeit with improvised lyrics. A demo was made by Lennon on 10 September 1971, called "Just Give Me Some Rock 'n' Roll", while Lennon was recording the soundtrack to an unreleased film, Clock. By late 1972, Lennon had rewritten the lyrics and finished developing the melody.

Authors Ben Urish and Ken Bielen suggest that "Meat City" "has no deep meaning but demonstrates that Lennon could still fashion a perfectly fine rocker if he wanted." Ultimate Classic Rock critic Nick DeRiso suggested that the lyrics could be "decrying our slide into hedonism" or just reflecting Lennon's appreciation for Lewis Carroll. The first part of the song reflects Lennon's excitement over the vitality of New York, America, and rock 'n' roll, despite being repulsed by some of the city's madness. Music critic Johnny Rogan interprets some of the lyrics as a parody on jive talk as well as on American consumerism. As an example, he gives the lines:

Freak City
Chickensuckin mothertrucking Meat City shookdown USA
Pig Meat City

The second part of the song reflects Lennon's view of China, which to Lennon was "the next frontier" of rock 'n' roll, and possibly an opportunity to use rock music as a means of liberation, as Lennon discussed in a 1972 quote:

I shall go there. I will take the opportunity to try to see Mao. If he is ill or dead or refuses to see me, too bad. But if I go there I want to meet people who are doing something important. I want to take a rock band to China. That is really what I want to do. To play rock in China. They have yet to see that.

Lennon used some of the backward recording techniques from his Beatles days on the song. On the album version of the song, after the first refrain of "Just gotta get me some rock and roll" there is a "squeaky" vocal which when played backwards has been deciphered as "Fuck a pig". On the single version released in the US and UK, an alternative backwards message says to "check the album".

The song begins with Lennon yelling "Well!" in rockabilly style. However, the rockabilly style is not continued. Rather, the song is driven by a boogie riff described by authors Ben Urish and Ken Bielen as "aggressive" and "funky". Authors Chip Madinger and Mark Easter describe the song as "an absolute cacophony of sound", suggesting that this is a welcome contrast to the "mellow" tone of most of Mind Games.

Lennon developed the riff for his later instrumental "Beef Jerky" by toying with variations on the music of this song and "Tight A$".

== Critical reception ==
According to rock journalist Paul du Noyer, "Meat City" is a "satisfying" complement to the single's A-side "Mind Games". Whereas "Mind Games" is "ethereal and contemplative", "Meat City" is "earthy and physical". Author John Blaney sees evidence of duality within "Meat City" itself. According to Blaney, "Meat City" shows Lennon excited and disturbed by the "abandonment of reason rock 'n' roll could elicit from its audience". Although Lennon tested the boundaries of convention, such as with sex and drugs, he was disturbed by "total abandonment to hedonism". Music critic Johnny Rogan calls the song "playfully acerbic and thankfully rocking". PopMatters describes the riff as one of Lennon's nastiest.

Allmusic critic Stephen Thomas Erlewine considers "Meat City" to be a "forced, ham-fisted rocker". Journalists Roy Carr and Tony Tyler do not regard the song highly, but suggest that it is "rescued" by its "peerless unison guitars and jived-up beat". Ultimate Classic Rock critic Nick DeRiso rated it as the Beatles (including their solo work) 18th weirdest song concluding that it "wastes one of Lennon's nastiest riffs with an unfocused narrative...and some tacked-on backward-masked nonsense".

== Personnel ==
The musicians who performed on the original recording were as follows:

- John Lennon – lead vocals, electric guitar, tambourine
- David Spinozza – electric guitar
- Ken Ascher – piano, electric piano
- Gordon Edwards – bass guitar
- Jim Keltner – drums
- Rick Marotta – drums
- Something Different (Christine Wiltshire, Jocelyn Brown, Kathy Mull, Angel Coakley) – backing vocals
