= Tight A$ =

Song by John Lennon

from the album Mind Games
- Released: 16 November 1973
- Recorded: July–August 1973
- Genre: Rock
- Length: 3:37
- Label: Apple
- Songwriter: John Lennon
- Producer: John Lennon

Mind Games track listing
- 12 tracks Side one: 1. "Mind Games"; 2. "Tight A$"; 3. "Aisumasen (I'm Sorry)"; 4. "One Day (At a Time)"; 5. "Bring on the Lucie (Freeda Peeple)"; 6. "Nutopian International Anthem"; Side two: 7. "Intuition"; 8. "Out the Blue"; 9. "Only People"; 10. "I Know (I Know)"; 11. "You Are Here"; 12. "Meat City"

"Tight A$" is a song written by John Lennon released on his 1973 album Mind Games. The song is also included in the 2010 compilation album, Gimme Some Truth.

== Lyrics & music ==
The title of "Tight A$" is a pun on the expressions "tight as" and "tight ass".

"Tight A$" is in a rockabilly style with a 1950s sound, along the lines of earlier rockabilly songs that inspired Lennon in his youth. Lennon biographer Geoffrey Giuliano describes the music as "funky". It is reminiscent of Elvis Presley's 1954 single "That's All Right". Pop music historian Robert Rodriguez also finds influences from Carl Perkins and Doug Sahm.

Lennon developed the riff for his later instrumental "Beef Jerky" by toying with variations on the music of this song and "Meat City". Du Noyer particularly praises the pedal steel guitar playing of Pete Kleinow, as does music critic Johnny Rogan. Pop culture historian Robert Rodriguez praises the "standout" extended guitar solo performed by David Spinozza.

Lennon recorded the song at Record Plant East over many takes. Take four was the version that was edited for release on Mind Games. The backing track for the released version was composed of four separate segments spliced together. The production uses echo to compress Lennon's vocal performance.

In 1975, Lennon wrote a letter to country singer Waylon Jennings, suggesting that Jennings record the song. Lennon believed the song would be a hit single for Jennings. Lennon had met Jennings, who had played in the final iteration of Buddy Holly's backup band, the Crickets, at the Grammy Awards several months earlier.

== Reception ==
AllMusic critic Stephen Thomas Erlewine describes "Tight A$" as a "forced, ham-fisted rocker". Author Tim Riley describes it as "dross". Du Noyer criticised it for having little to say, lacking energy and being an example of Lennon's ability for "knocking off songs to fulfil the album's quota". John Blaney also criticises the song for having little to say, but acknowledges that the song's "jokey wordplay was a timely reminder of what Lennon was capable of". Chip Madinger and Mark Easter regard the fact that the song isn't "about something" to be refreshing, given Lennon's "political ranting and raving" in the period just before the song's release and praise the song as "a rockin' little tune". PopMatters describes the song as a "throwaway" but appreciates that it provides some "mindless fun". Lennon himself described the song as "a bit of a throwaway".

Robert Rodriguez, however, regards it as one of the "best unsung John" Lennon songs and "one of the highlights of Mind Games". Rodriguez considers it a rocker of the sort that the Beatles used to play in their early days, sounding like an American song sung by an Englishman. Although Rodriguez agrees that the song isn't about much, it represents the type of writing Lennon had often done earlier in his career "when a string of words that scanned nicely was enough," and also praises the band's tight playing on the song. Johnny Rogan also praises the song as "one of the more interesting moments" of Mind Games, although acknowledging that it does not have the "greatest tune". Keith Spore of The Milwaukee Sentinel called the song a "smashing serpentine rocker" which serves as a reminder of Lennon's past brilliance. Rolling Stone Magazine critic Stephen Holden regards "Tight A$" as one of the two highlights of Mind Games, along with the title track. Journalists Roy Carr and Tony Tyler also regard it as one of the best songs on Mind Games, saying it demonstrates the return of Lennon's "cockiness and irreverence," which they consider to possibly be his best qualities.

== Personnel ==
The musicians who performed on the original recording were as follows:

- John Lennon – vocals, acoustic guitar, electric guitar, tambourine
- David Spinozza – electric guitar
- Ken Ascher – piano
- Gordon Edwards – bass guitar
- Jim Keltner – drums
- Pete Kleinow – pedal steel guitar
