= Only People (song) =

Song by John Lennon

from the album Mind Games
- Released: 16 November 1973
- Recorded: July–August 1973
- Genre: Rock
- Length: 3:23
- Label: Apple
- Songwriter: John Lennon
- Producer: John Lennon

Mind Games track listing
- 12 tracks Side one: 1. "Mind Games"; 2. "Tight A$"; 3. "Aisumasen (I'm Sorry)"; 4. "One Day (At a Time)"; 5. "Bring on the Lucie (Freeda Peeple)"; 6. "Nutopian International Anthem"; Side two: 7. "Intuition"; 8. "Out the Blue"; 9. "Only People"; 10. "I Know (I Know)"; 11. "You Are Here"; 12. "Meat City"

"Only People" is a song written by John Lennon released on his 1973 album Mind Games.

The song is included on the 2010 album, Gimme Some Truth. "Only People" revolves around Lennon's and Ono's personal philosophy. Lennon said that it failed as a song, saying that in an interview with Playboy, "It was a good lick, but I couldn't get the words to make sense."

== Personnel ==
The musicians who performed on the original recording were:

- John Lennon – lead vocals, electric guitar, Clavinet, handclaps
- David Spinozza – electric guitar
- Ken Ascher – piano, Fender Rhodes electric piano
- Michael Brecker – saxophone
- Gordon Edwards – bass guitar
- Jim Keltner – drums, cowbell
- Something Different (Christine Wiltshire, Jocelyn Brown, Kathy Mull, Angel Coakley) – backing vocals
