= Come Together: A Night for John Lennon's Words and Music =

2001 television program

Come Together: A Night for John Lennon's Words and Music is a 2001 television program tribute to John Lennon aired on both TNT and The WB.

Originally planned to celebrate Lennon's accomplishments, the concert took place on October 2, 2001, at Radio City Music Hall in New York City, shortly after the September 11 attacks and exactly one week before the 61st anniversary of Lennon's birth. It was dedicated to "New York City and its people" and presented as a fundraiser for the Robin Hood Foundation.

The concert was named for Lennon's Beatles song, "Come Together".

== Participants ==
Well-known people performed John Lennon songs and spoke about him, including his widow Yoko Ono, his son Sean Lennon, Yolanda Adams, Marc Anthony, Beck, Craig David, Edie Falco, Nelly Furtado, James Gandolfini, Dustin Hoffman, Cyndi Lauper, Shelby Lynne, Dave Matthews, Natalie Merchant, Moby, Alanis Morissette, Billy Preston, Lou Reed, Robert Schwartzman, Shaggy, Dave Stewart, Stone Temple Pilots, and Rufus Wainwright. The program also features interview and performance clips of Lennon.

The program was hosted by Kevin Spacey, who also performed one of Lennon's songs, "Mind Games".

== Performances ==
All songs were written and composed by Lennon, except where noted

1. "Imagine" – Yolanda Adams and Billy Preston
2. "In My Life" (Lennon/McCartney) – Dave Matthews
3. "Revolution" (Lennon/McCartney) – Stone Temple Pilots
4. "Dear Prudence" (Lennon/McCartney) – Alanis Morissette
5. "Across the Universe" (Lennon/McCartney) – Moby, Sean Lennon and Rufus Wainwright
6. "Strawberry Fields Forever" (Lennon/McCartney) – Cyndi Lauper
7. "Lucy in the Sky with Diamonds" (Lennon/McCartney) – Marc Anthony
8. "Mother" – Shelby Lynne
9. "Instant Karma!" – Nelly Furtado and Dave Stewart
10. "Jealous Guy" – Lou Reed
11. "Nowhere Man" (Lennon/McCartney) – Natalie Merchant
12. "Mind Games" – Kevin Spacey
13. "Come Together" (Lennon/McCartney) – Craig David
14. "This Boy" (Lennon/McCartney) – Sean Lennon, Rufus Wainwright and Robert Schwartzman
15. "Julia" (Lennon/McCartney) – Sean Lennon
16. "Give Peace a Chance"/"Power to the People" – Ensemble
