= Soleil (Jean-Pierre Ferland album) =

Soleil (a.k.a. "Jean-Pierre Ferland")

Studio album by Jean-Pierre Ferland
- Released: 1971
- Genre: Folk rock, art rock
- Label: Barclay 80114/80115

Jean-Pierre Ferland chronology
Jaune (1970)	Soleil (a.k.a. "Jean-Pierre Ferland") (1971)	Les Vierges du Québec (1974)

Soleil is an album by Jean-Pierre Ferland, released in 1971. It is a double album with as many as 14 songs. Guitarist David Spinozza is featured on the album, he has played on Jean-Pierre Ferland's previous album Jaune which was published in 1970, and he who would also play with Paul and Linda McCartney on their album Ram in 1971.

== Track list ==
All tracks written and composed by Jean-Pierre Ferland and Paul Baillargeon, except "Sœur Marie" by Ferland, Baillargeon and David Spinozza.

Side one

1. Le monde est parallèle
2. Mon frère
3. Monsieur Gobeil
4. J'ai neuf ans

Side two

1. Au fond des choses le soleil emmène au soleil
2. Sœur Marie de l'Enfant Jésus
3. Si on s'y mettait

Side three

1. Toi et moi
2. Mon ami J.C.
3. Sur la route 11

Side four

1. Fais dodo
2. Rose Magui
3. Jennifer
4. Pot-pourri endiablé de quelques succès du disque

== Musicians ==
- Jean-Pierre Ferland : Vocals
- Paul Baillargeon : piano, organ, synthesizer, orchestrations
- Claude Demers : Synthesizer programming
- David Spinozza : Acoustic and electric guitars
- Don Habib : Bass
- Richard Provençal : Drums
- Denise Lupien, Maurice Pelletier, Nicole Laflamme, Hélène Rioux, Josianne Roy, Francine Lupien, Sylvie Laville, Denise Boucher, Lorraine Desmarais, William Lunn, Jean-Luc Morin : Strings
- Serge Chevanel, Jean-Louis Chatel, Jean-Pierre Carpentier, Julio Massella, Ted Griffith, Émile Subirana : Brass
- Marcel Baillargeon : Flute
- Nick Ayoub : Oboe
- Charles Linton, Denis Forcier, Patricia Gallant, Judy Richards, France Castel, Denise Bérard, Paul Baillargeon, Louise Lemire : Chorus
- Pierre Béluse: Percussion
- Michel Séguin: Congas

== Production ==
- Jean-Pierre Ferland : Production
- André Perry : Production, sound engineer, mixing
- Claude Demers : Engineer
- Studios André Perry (Montreal) : Recording and mixing
- Sidney Massari : Album cover and booklet
- Ronald Labelle : Photography
- Roxanne Gagnon : Illustration
