= Jean-Pierre Ferland (album) =

Studio album by Jean-Pierre Ferland
- Released: 1980
- Genre: Folk/Rock
- Label: Telson AE-1524
- Producer: Jean-Pierre Ferland

Jean-Pierre Ferland chronology
La Pleine Lune (1977)	Jean-Pierre Ferland (1980)	Écoute Pas Ça (1995)

Professional ratings
Review scores
Source	Rating
AllMusic	3/5 stars

Jean-Pierre Ferland is a self-titled album by Jean-Pierre Ferland, released in 1980.

== Track listing ==
All tracks written by Jean-Pierre Ferland except where noted.

=== Side one ===
1. Si Je Savais Jouer du Piano
2. Fer-à-Piton
3. Les Jambes
4. C'est ça l'Amour

=== Side two ===
1. Les Courtisanes
2. Chanson pour Félix
3. La Vie est Longue
4. A Quoi ça Sert d'être Millionaire
5. La Punk Rock (Chanson New Wave)
