= India, India =

Song by John Lennon

from the album John Lennon Signature Box
- Released: 5 October 2010
- Recorded: 1980
- Genre: Rock
- Length: 3:07
- Label: EMI
- Songwriter(s): John Lennon
- Producer(s): John Lennon

"India, India" is a song written by John Lennon and recorded in 1980, but not released until 2010's John Lennon Signature Box. The song, with "I Don't Want to Lose You", was also featured in the 2005 musical Lennon.

== History ==
This song was originally written for the un-made 1970s play, "The Ballad of John and Yoko". "India, India" was one of two previously unreleased songs issued on the John Lennon Signature Box in 2010 (the other was "One of the Boys"). The song was inspired by The Beatles' stay in India in 1968.
