= John Lennon Signature Box =

Box set by John Lennon
- Released: 5 October 2010
- Recorded: 1969–1983
- Genre: Rock
- Length: 451:47
- Label: EMI
- Producers: Yoko Ono, John Lennon, Phil Spector

John Lennon chronology
Power to the People: The Hits (2010)	John Lennon Signature Box (2010)	Icon (2014)

Alternate image
- John Lennon Signature Box expanded

Professional ratings
Review scores
Source	Rating
AllMusic	4.5/5 stars
The Austin Chronicle	3/5 stars
Mojo	3/5 stars
The Phoenix	3.5/5 stars
Pitchfork Media	6.2/10
Uncut	3/5 stars

The John Lennon Signature Box is an 11-disc boxed set of remastered John Lennon albums and new collections, released on CD and digital format, as part of the "Gimme Some Truth" collection.

== Overview ==
The box set includes all of John Lennon's studio albums along with two additional discs of non-album singles and home demos.

The albums released in the boxed set are digital remasters of the original recordings and mixes, done by John's widow Yoko Ono and the same team of engineers at Abbey Road Studios who worked on the 2009 remasters by the Beatles, in London and Avatar Studios, New York.

The boxed set was released on vinyl in June 2015 by Universal Music Catalogue without the two additional discs.

== Album listing ==
- Disc 1: John Lennon/Plastic Ono Band (1970)
- Disc 2: Imagine (1971)
- Discs 3 & 4: Some Time in New York City (1972)
- Disc 5: Mind Games (1973)
- Disc 6: Walls and Bridges (1974)
- Disc 7: Rock 'n' Roll (1975)
- Disc 8: Double Fantasy (1980)
- Disc 9: Milk and Honey (1984)

=== Additional content ===
Disc 10 – Non-Album Singles

1. "Power to the People" – 3:25
2. "Happy Xmas (War Is Over)" – 3:34
3. "Instant Karma! (We All Shine On)" – 3:21
4. "Cold Turkey" – 5:03
5. "Move Over Ms. L" – 2:58
6. "Give Peace a Chance" – 4:55

Disc 11 – Home Tapes

1. "Mother" – 4:25
2. "Love" – 2:39
3. "God" – 4:35
4. "I Found Out" – 4:34
5. "Nobody Told Me" – 3:13
6. "Honey Don't" – 1:40
7. "One of the Boys" – 2:39
8. "India, India" – 3:07
9. "Serve Yourself" – 5:21
10. "Isolation" – 3:07
11. "Remember" – 5:29
12. "Beautiful Boy (Darling Boy)" – 4:11
13. "I Don't Want to Be a Soldier" – 3:26

== Charts ==
Chart performance for John Lennon Signature Box
Chart (2010–2026)	Peak position
Belgian Albums (Ultratop Flanders)	93
Belgian Albums (Ultratop Wallonia)	195
Canadian Albums (Billboard)	71
Dutch Albums (Album Top 100)	16
French Albums (SNEP)	137
German Albums (Offizielle Top 100)	19
German Pop Albums (Offizielle Top 100)	13
Norwegian Albums (VG-lista)	23
Swedish Albums (Sverigetopplistan)	40
US Billboard 200	148

== See also ==
- The Beatles (The Original Studio Recordings)
- The Beatles in Mono
