= Jaune (album) =

Studio album by Jean-Pierre Ferland
- Released: 1970
- Genre: Folk rock, art rock
- Label: Barclay 80090

Jean-Pierre Ferland chronology
Un Peu Plus Loin (1969)	Jaune (1970)	Soleil (1971)

Jaune is an album by Jean-Pierre Ferland, released in 1970. Considered an enduring classic of Canadian and Quebec music, the album was named the 71st greatest Canadian album of all time in Bob Mersereau's 2007 book The Top 100 Canadian Albums. It was the only francophone album from Quebec named to the list besides the three studio albums by Harmonium.

In 2005 Ferland released a 35th anniversary box set version of the album, which included the original album, new recordings of the album's songs by Ferland himself, an audio DVD including a surround sound remastering of the album, and a disc including covers of the album's songs by musicians such as Ariane Moffatt, Champion, Montag, Sixtoo, Kid Loco and Carl Bastien. "Le Chat du café des artistes" was covered by Charlotte Gainsbourg on her 2010 album IRM.

American musicians, guitarist David Spinozza, bassist Tony Levin & drummer Jim Young played on this album. On keyboards—mainly piano—, synthesizer and arrangements, Michel Robidoux was the leader.

In 2018, the album won the Polaris Heritage Prize Jury Award in the 1960-1975 category.

== Track listing ==
1. "Prologue"
2. "Le Petit roi"
3. "Quand on aime on a toujours 20 ans"
4. "Sing Sing"
5. "God Is an American"
6. "Le Chat du café des artistes"
7. "..."
8. "Y'a des jours"
9. "Ce qu'on dit quand on tient une femme dans ses bras"
10. "Épilogue"
11. "It Ain't Fair"

== Personnel ==
- Jean-Pierre Ferland; vocals
- Michel Robidoux; piano, organ, Moog synthesizer, arrangements
- David Spinozza; acoustic and electric guitars
- Tony Levin; bass
- Jim Young; drums
- Les Petits Chanteurs du Mont-Royal; chorus
- Josianne Roy; strings, arrangements
- Guido Basso; brass, arrangements
