= Nutopian International Anthem =

Composition by John Lennon

from the album Mind Games
- Released: 16 November 1973
- Recorded: July – August 1973
- Length: 0:03
- Label: Apple
- Songwriter: John Lennon
- Producer: John Lennon

Mind Games track listing
- 12 tracks Side one: 1. "Mind Games"; 2. "Tight A$"; 3. "Aisumasen (I'm Sorry)"; 4. "One Day (At a Time)"; 5. "Bring on the Lucie (Freeda Peeple)"; 6. "Nutopian International Anthem"; Side two: 7. "Intuition"; 8. "Out the Blue"; 9. "Only People"; 10. "I Know (I Know)"; 11. "You Are Here"; 12. "Meat City"

"Nutopian International Anthem" is a recording of 3 seconds of silence by the English musician and former Beatles member John Lennon from his 1973 album Mind Games.

== Background ==
Nutopia is a conceptual country created and announced by John Lennon and Yoko Ono. The 3-second long composition consisting of silence was created as the anthem to the country created by the two. It was not the first time Lennon experimented with the concept of a song consisting of silence as he had released a song called Two Minutes Silence on the album Unfinished Music No. 2: Life with the Lions (1969).

== Reception ==
Authors Ben Urish and Ken Bielen said the composition might work as a theme of a unified theme or principle of the album. Author Johnny Rogan stated that the silence was appropriate, seeing as Nutopia is a Greek word, meaning nothing.

== Declaration of Nutopia ==
The Mind Games Ultimate Collection box set features an audio track of the declaration of Nutopia, where John Lennon talks about how to become a citizen of Nutopia. Lennon stated "We put the thought out, then we’ll react to whatever the reaction is."
