= Jean-Pierre Ferland =

Canadian singer and songwriter (1934–2024)

Jean-Pierre Ferland OC CQ
- Born: June 24, 1934; Montreal, Quebec, Canada
- Origin: Canadian
- Died: April 27, 2024 (aged 89) Saint-Gabriel-de-Brandon, Quebec, Canada
- Genres: Folk rock, art rock, blues, pop, country
- Occupations: Singer-songwriter, author, poet
- Instruments: Vocals, guitar, keyboards/piano
- Years active: 1959–2017
- Labels: Barclay, Telson

Jean-Pierre Ferland, OC CQ (French pronunciation: [ʒɑ̃ pjɛʁ fɛʁlɑ̃]; June 24, 1934 – April 27, 2024) was a Québécois singer and songwriter. He was noted for writing over 450 songs and releasing more than 30 albums. He was inducted into the Canadian Songwriters Hall of Fame in 2007.

== Early life ==
Ferland was born in the Le Plateau-Mont-Royal borough of Montreal on June 24, 1934. He studied at the École des Hautes Études Commerciales de Montréal and was first employed as an accountant after graduating. He subsequently worked as a scheduling clerk at Radio-Canada from 1954 to 1958. His colleagues there urged him to hone his aptitude in singing and he authored poems during his free time. He also began taking guitar lessons with Stephen Fentok.

== Career ==
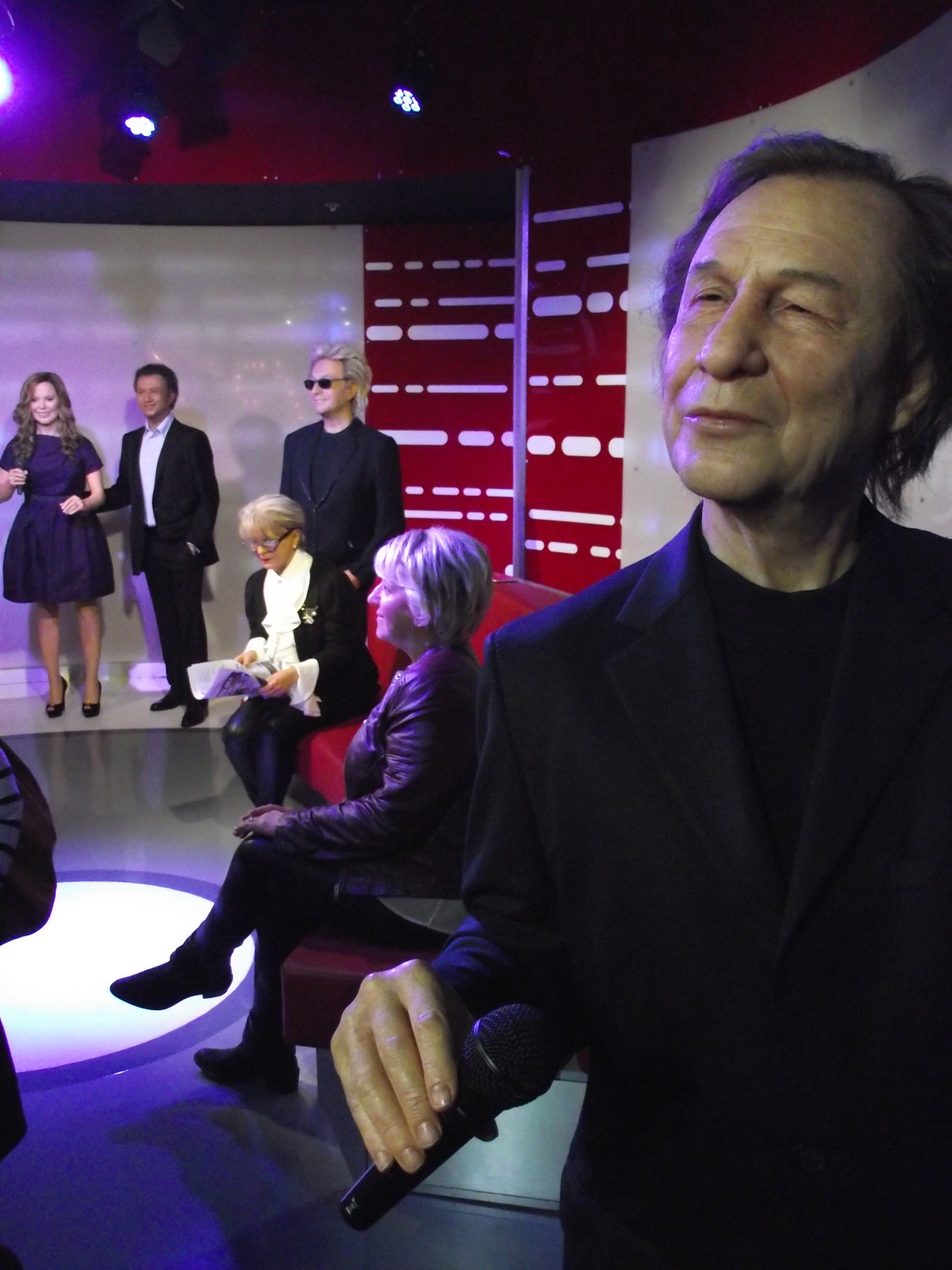
Jean-Pierre Ferland's wax sculpture at Musée Grévin Montreal

After departing Radio-Canada, in February 1958, Ferland began recording the first songs that would eventually comprise his first album Jean-Pierre. However, it was not until 1961 that he became known to the public, with the release of his second album, Rendez-vous à La Coda. He also won the Chansons sur mesure competition by Radio-Canada that same year with his song "Feuilles de gui". It was also awarded the grand prize at the Gala internationale de la chanson in Brussels the following year.

From 1962 to 1970, Ferland spent much time in Europe (mainly in France and Belgium), writing music and recording albums, as well as performing at a multitude of venues, including shows in Olympia and Bobino. He represented Canada at the 1963 Concours international de la chanson in Kraków, where he received the prize for best performer. Five years later, he won the Académie Charles Cros Award.

Ferland launched the disc Jaune (1970), which sold 60,000 copies within a year and was followed by live shows at the Montreal's Place des Arts. Also, that year, he sang at Expo '70 in Osaka. In 1974, his song "T'es mon amour, t'es ma maîtresse", recorded with Ginette Reno became a hit (#38 CAN-AC Charts).

In 1976, Ferland was one of the five performers (along with Claude Léveillée, Gilles Vigneault, Robert Charlebois and Yvon Deschamps) in the giant outdoor concert for the National Holiday on June 21 in Quebec and on June 23 in Montreal, titled 1 fois 5. The album of the same name followed, and in 1977, it received the Académie Charles Cros Award.

In the 1980s, Ferland combined songwriting and touring with a career as a television presenter for several popular shows: Station soleil (Radio Québec, 1981–1987), Tapis rouge (SRC, 1986), L'autobus du showbusiness (SRC, 1987), and Ferland/Nadeau (Télé-Métropole, 1990).

== Later life and death ==
Ferland had a stroke caused by fatigue and stress on October 12, 2006, which led him to cancel his final concert at the Bell Centre the following day. He recovered quickly, enabling him to give his farewell concert on January 13 the following year. After retiring from the spotlight, Ferland made an appearance on the Plains of Abraham to perform with Céline Dion on August 22, 2008. Other guest stage appearances, radio and television engagements followed, including coaching in La Voix (season 1). In 2017, Jean-Pierre Ferland released an album La vie m'émeut, l'amour m'étonne.

Ferland died on April 27, 2024, at a care home in Saint-Gabriel-de-Brandon, Quebec. He was 89, and was placed in long-term care two months prior to his death.

== Awards and honours ==
Ferland was appointed an officer of the Order of Canada (OC) in May 1996, in recognition of his 30 albums released and 450 songs written. Seven years later, he was made a Knight of the National Order of Quebec (CQ). He was enshrined in the Canadian Songwriters Hall of Fame in January 2007.

Ferland was the recipient of the National Achievement Award at the 1999 SOCAN Awards held in Montreal. Six years later, he was honoured by the AV Trust of Canada for the album Jaune with collaboration of Michael Georges. On August 5, 2000, Ferland performed at the wedding of the Hell's Angel René Charlebois, and at the same wedding posed for photographs with Maurice "Mom" Boucher, the leader of the Angels in Quebec at the time.

Ferland also received both the Queen Elizabeth II Golden Jubilee Medal and Queen Elizabeth II Diamond Jubilee Medal.

== Discography ==
- Jean-Pierre – 1959
- Rendez-vous à La Coda – 1961
- J'aime, j'estime, j'amoure – 1962
- Jean-Pierre Ferland à Bobino – 1963
- M'aimeras-tu, m'aimeras-tu pas – 1964
- Jean-Pierre Ferland vol 4 – 1965
- Jean-Pierre Ferland vol 5 – 1966
- Je reviens chez nous – 1968
- Un Peu Plus Loin – 1969
- Jaune – 1970 (with notable, at the time very young, American session musicians Tony Levin and David Spinozza)
- Soleil – 1971
- Les Vierges du Québec – 1974
- Le Showbusiness – 1975
- Quand on Aime on a Toujours 20 Ans – 1975
- 1 Fois 5 – 1976
- La Pleine Lune – 1977
- Jean-Pierre Ferland – 1980
- Y'a pas deux chansons pareilles – 1981
- Androgyne – 1984
- Bleu blanc blues – 1992
- Écoute pas ça – 1995
- L'amour c'est d'l'ouvrage – 1999
- Bijoux de famille – 2009
- Jaune/Les Noces D'or – 2011 No. 51 CAN
- Chansons Jalouses – 2016
- La vie m'émeut, l'amour m'étonne – 2017
