= Mind Games (John Lennon album) =

Studio album by John Lennon
- Released: 29 October 1973
- Recorded: July–August 1973
- Studios: Record Plant, New York City
- Genres: Rock; pop rock
- Length: 40:41
- Label: Apple
- Producer: John Lennon

John Lennon chronology
| Some Time in New York City (1972) | Mind Games (1973) | Walls and Bridges (1974) |

Singles from Mind Games
- 1. "Mind Games" Released: 29 October 1973 (US)

Mind Games is the third solo studio album by the English musician John Lennon. It was recorded at Record Plant Studios in New York in mid-1973. The album was released in the US on 29 October 1973 and in the UK on 16 November 1973. It was Lennon's first self-produced recording without help from Phil Spector. Like his previous album, the politically topical and somewhat abrasive Some Time in New York City, Mind Games received mixed reviews upon release. It reached number 13 in the UK and number 9 in the US, where it was certified gold in both territories.

The album was recorded while Lennon was having difficulties with US immigration and at the beginning of his 18-month separation from Yoko Ono. The title track was released as a single at the same time as the album. The album itself was later reissued several times throughout the 1970s and 1980s, and as an expanded super deluxe box in 2024.

== Background ==
By the start of 1973, John Lennon began distancing himself from the political and social issues he had embraced in the previous 18 months. It was also around this time that he and his wife, Yoko Ono, were going through marital problems. As Ono was completing her fourth album, Feeling the Space, Lennon decided he also wanted to record a new album, and liked the studio musicians that their assistant and production coordinator May Pang had assembled for Ono's album. Shortly thereafter, he asked Pang to book them for his sessions. Wanting to produce an album that would be more accepted than his previous politically charged commercial flop Some Time in New York City, Lennon began writing and demoing a few songs for Mind Games in his Greenwich Village apartment. He began composing after a period of almost a year of not writing any material.

Amid frequent court appearances battling to stay in the United States, Lennon became stressed, a situation that was only worsened by constant surveillance by the FBI, due to his political activism. Lennon said, "I just couldn't function, you know? I was so paranoid from them tappin' the phone and followin' me." All this combined made Lennon begin to feel emotionally withdrawn. Lennon put his suffering aside to write the songs for Mind Games, writing all the songs for it in a week.

Under the moniker of "The Plastic U.F.Ono Band", Lennon engaged the services of session drummer Jim Keltner, guitarist David Spinozza, Gordon Edwards on bass, Arthur Jenkins on percussion, Michael Brecker on saxophone, Ken Ascher on piano and organ, and the vocal backing of a group called Something Different. Difficulties between Lennon and Ono became more and more noticeable around this time. As the sessions were under way starting in June at New York's Record Plant Studios, John and Yoko would later separate by around August. At Ono's urging, Pang became Lennon's companion and lover in what would become an 18-month relationship later renowned as Lennon's "lost weekend".

== Recording and content ==
Mind Games was recorded between July and August 1973 in Lennon's characteristic quick fashion, and was mixed over a two-week period. Lennon produced the album by himself, following his previous three-year partnership with Phil Spector. When the album was remixed in 2002, many audio anomalies hidden in the original mixing were uncovered. Some rough mixes appear on bootlegs and on 1998's John Lennon Anthology.

The album continued Lennon's previous attempts to chronicle his life through his songs, the tone of which displays a range of mixed feelings. Among the sombre and melodic songs directed to Ono, "Aisumasen (I'm Sorry)" was originally titled "Call My Name", a song in which Lennon was offering to comfort someone, whereas the final version sees him asking for forgiveness. In "One Day (At a Time)", Lennon sings about his devotion to Ono. (Note: While he was recording the song, singing in his normal vocal register throughout the recording, Lennon adopted a falsetto when attempting a vocal overdub.) "Out the Blue" also reflects Lennon's devotion to his wife, and reflects its author's self-doubt as a result of their separation. "Out the Blue" incorporates several musical genres, starting with a gentle, melancholy acoustic guitar and moving through gospel, country, and choral music portions. Another love song, "You Are Here" took its title from Lennon's one-off art exhibition at the Robert Fraser Gallery. By the time of the Mind Games sessions, the composition had gone through several different themes, before Lennon settled on the theme of love and peace. The original master take of "You Are Here" featured an extra verse, that was about Japan and England.

Other songs on the album are more light-hearted and optimistic, marking the return of Lennon's humour and wit after the uncompromising doctrine espoused on Some Time in New York City. These tracks include "Intuition", in which Lennon relates how life experience has honed his instincts and how it's good to have gotten through it. While demoing the song on piano in early 1973, with the lyrics still incomplete, he added a few lines from two previously released tracks – "How?", from Imagine (1971), and "God", from John Lennon/Plastic Ono Band (1970). "Only People" reflects his and Ono's personal philosophy. Lennon later said that it failed as a song, however; in an interview with Playboy, he remarked: "It was a good lick, but I couldn't get the words to make sense."

Also appearing on Mind Games are songs that indulged Lennon's affinity for pure rock 'n' roll, such as "Tight A$", the title of which was a pun on the expressions "tight as" and "tight ass". The track is in the rockabilly style with a 1950s sound, along the lines of songs that inspired Lennon in his youth. Another rock track, "Meat City" contains lyrics more in keeping with Lennon's earlier penchant for obscure imagery over the personal. The song was a boogie piece until late in 1971, when it began to take its final form, although with improvised lyrics. By late 1972, Lennon had rewritten the words and finished developing the melody.

The song "Mind Games", with its "love is the answer" refrain and call to "make love not war", recalls Lennon's work with the Beatles in 1967. He started writing the track during the band's Get Back sessions, in early 1969, with the title "Make Love, Not War". Lennon finished it after reading the book Mind Games: The Guide to Inner Space. (Note: He later encountered the author in a restaurant, and when the author asked about Lennon's reaction to the book, he replied: "I am one of your fans. You wrote Mind Games.") Lennon had recorded demos of the retitled "Mind Games" on 28 and 29 December 1970, at his home studio, Ascot Sound Studios.

"Bring on the Lucie (Freda Peeple)" dated from late 1971, having started out as little more than a chorus, after Lennon acquired a National guitar. Once he had worked on the lyrics, the song went from a simple political slogan to a full-blown statement that hints at his earlier work, such as "Imagine" and "Power to the People". "Only People" and the three-second silent "Nutopian International Anthem" were the only political tracks on the album. The latter referred to "Nutopia: The Country of Peace", a conceptual country which the Lennons had announced at a press conference in New York City on April Fool's Day 1973. (Note: The album's inner sleeve featured a "Declaration of Nutopia", in which people could become a citizen of Nutopia if they spoke about Nutopia.) "I Know (I Know)" features lyrics in which Lennon apologises for his thoughtlessness and discusses the causes of his insecurity. On some of the rough mixes available on bootlegs, the time-consuming overdubbing on the song is apparent, as Lennon gradually refined the arrangement. The final track on Mind Games, "Meat City" contains a Lennon curse, "Fuck a pig!", sped up and backwards, while the mix used as the B-side to the "Mind Games" single gave the same treatment to the phrase "Check the album!"

"Rock and Roll People" was also recorded during the album's sessions and given to Johnny Winter for his John Dawson Winter III album. Lennon's version remained unreleased until 1986's posthumous Menlove Ave. album.

== Release and promotion ==
Tony King, vice-president of Apple Records in Los Angeles at the time, convinced Lennon to promote Mind Games, arranging interviews for Lennon with Billboard and Record World. He also persuaded Lennon to do a television commercial in which King dressed up as the Queen of the United Kingdom and waltzed with Lennon (the commercial session can be seen in the 1988 film Imagine: John Lennon). King reprised his role as the Queen for two radio spots promoting the album.

Lennon created the Mind Games album cover himself, hand-cutting the photos. The front and back covers are similar; on the back sleeve Lennon is more toward the foreground, representing his symbolic walking away from Ono and her apparent mountainous influence on him.

Mind Games was released on 29 October in America and 16 November in Britain, (Note: With the respective catalogue numbers: US Capitiol SW-3414 and UK Apple PCS 7165.) around the same time as Ono's Feeling the Space. Apple Records issued the title track as a single, with the release dates matching those of the album in the US and UK. (Note: While "Mind Games" was the single in other countries, "Bring on the Lucie (Freeda Peeple)", backed with "You Are Here", was a single in Venezuela. (Venezuela Apple 4AP 1844)) The single reached number 26 in the UK, and peaked at number 18 on the Billboard Hot 100 in the US. The album charted at number 13 in the UK and peaked at number 9 on Billboard's Top LP's listings. Although Mind Games sold better than Some Time in New York City, its release "came and went with barely a ripple", according to Beatles biographer Chris Ingham. Author Peter Doggett similarly writes that the album "did nothing to alter [Lennon's] status as the least commercially successful Beatle".

== Critical reception ==
Retrospective professional ratings
Review scores
| Source | Rating |
|---|---|
| AllMusic | 4/5 stars |
| Christgau's Record Guide | C+ |
| Mojo | 3/5 stars |
| The Music Box | 3.5/5 stars |
| MusicHound Rock | 3/5 |
| Paste | 4/5 stars |
| Rolling Stone | 4/5 stars |
| Uncut | 3/5 stars |

Jon Landau of Rolling Stone magazine assessed the songs on Mind Games as "his worst writing yet" and considered that Lennon was "helplessly trying to impose his own gargantuan ego upon an audience ... [that] is waiting hopefully for him to chart a new course". While finding the music "listenable", Landau identified the album's lyrics as "misguided in so underrating his audience's intelligence" and added: "But then, perhaps Lennon's didacticism, preaching and banality are part of the mind game of the album's title ..." More impressed, Melody Maker's Ray Coleman found that "The raw nerves of a Lennon battered by America's curious logic and sheer hard-heartedness seem to have spurred him to write incisively ..." Coleman concluded of Mind Games: "Musically or melodically this may not be a stand-out album, but if you warm to the rasping voice of Lennon and, like me, regard him as the true fulcrum of much of what came from his old group, then like any new Lennon album, it will be enjoyable and even important." In Creem magazine, Robert Christgau described the album as "a step in the right direction ... but only a step. It sounds like out-takes from Imagine, which may not seem so bad but means that Lennon is falling back on ideas (intellectual and musical) that have lost their freshness for him: Still, the single works, and let's hope he keeps right on stepping."

Writing in their 1975 book The Beatles: An Illustrated Record, NME journalists Roy Carr and Tony Tyler opined that Mind Games "bears all the hallmarks of being made without any definite objective in mind – other than to redeem the unpleasantness of Some Time In New York City". While noting the singer's attempts to re-create "the lyricism and melodic inventiveness" of Imagine, Carr and Tyler continued: "The reason the total album is not more effective can be laid at the door of Lennon's personal situation, and on his tendency to react to events, instead of initiating them." In The Beatles Apart (1981), Bob Woffinden considered that, aside from the "excellent" title track and "Bring on the Lucie", Mind Games "consisted of so-so songs that hardly lodged in the memory", and that "The best one can say of the album is that it's exceptionally well produced."

In a more recent review, for AllMusic, critic Stephen Thomas Erlewine writes that "confusion ... lies at the heart of the album. Lennon doesn't know which way to go, so he tries everything." Erlewine adds: "While the best numbers are among Lennon's finest, there's only a handful of them, and the remainder of the record is simply pleasant."

== Reissues ==
The album was reissued in the US on Capitol Records in 1978 and 1980, with the latter being a budget reissue. (Note: US Capitol SN-15968) In the UK, the album was reissued on EMI's budget label, Music for Pleasure (MFP), on 28 November 1980, featuring a different album cover. (Note: UK Music for Pleasure MFP 5058) After Lennon's death in December 1980, the album, along with seven other Lennon albums, was reissued by EMI as part of a box set, which was released in the UK on 15 June 1981. (Note: UK EMI JLB8) It was first issued on CD on 3 August 1987, this time on the Parlophone label, (Note: UK Parlophone CDP 7 46769 2) and several months later on 22 March 1988 in the US on the Capitol label.

In 2002, a remixing of Mind Games for its remastered reissue, containing three previously unreleased demo recordings, (Note: One of the demos, a home demo of "Meat City", features a lyric-less melody that would later be used as a countermelody for "Steel and Glass".) was overseen by Allan Rouse, which was released on 21 October 2002 in the UK, (Note: Europe EMI 7243 5 42425 2 6) and on 5 November 2002 in the US. It was reissued again by Mobile Fidelity Sound Lab in 2004 on CD (Note: US Mobile Fidelity Sound Lab UDCD 761) and LP. (Note: US Mobile Fidelity Sound Lab MFSL 1–293) In 2010, the original mix was remastered as part of the re-release of Lennon's entire catalogue, the album was available separately or as part of the John Lennon Signature Box.

=== The Ultimate Collection ===
Professional ratings
Super Deluxe box set
Review scores
| Source | Rating |
|---|---|
| Mojo | 4/5 stars |
| Rolling Stone | 4/5 stars |

An expanded version of the album titled Mind Games – The Ultimate Collection was released on 12 July 2024. This release contained the original album remixed in Dolby Atmos, in addition to three alternate remixes of the album, mini audio documentaries of each song, and studio outtakes. A specially-packed eight-disc "Super Deluxe" edition was available, containing six CDs and two Blu-ray discs, in a limited supply of 1100 copies. Disc one offers new stereo mixes of the original album created from high-definition transfers of the original multitrack recordings. Disc two's 'elemental' mixes are stripped back and without drums, emphasising Lennon's voice. Disc three's 'elements' mixes highlight musician performances. Disc five's raw studio mixes is what was recorded during the sessions with minimum effects. A separate coffee table book was released on 24 September.

The box set was produced over two years and art directed by Sean Ono Lennon and Simon Hilton. In an interview with BBC Radio 6 Music, Sean Ono Lennon stated that the box set is "a kind of love letter to my parents" and the best effort he has made to try to be a good son.

On 2 February 2025, the Super Deluxe box set won the Grammy Award for Best Boxed or Special Limited Edition Package. Upon receiving the award, Sean Ono Lennon delivered an acceptance speech in which he mentioned that it was a great honor to work with his father’s musical material, that the message of peace and love from John and Yoko remains important, and that he will continue working hard to keep the music of the Beatles and John Lennon alive around the world.

== Track listing ==
All tracks are written by John Lennon.

Side one
| No. | Title | Length |
|---|---|---|
| 1. | "Mind Games" | 4:13 |
| 2. | "Tight A$" | 3:37 |
| 3. | "Aisumasen (I'm Sorry)" | 4:44 |
| 4. | "One Day (At a Time)" | 3:09 |
| 5. | "Bring On the Lucie (Freda Peeple)" | 4:12 |
| 6. | "Nutopian International Anthem" | 0:03 |

Side two
| No. | Title | Length |
|---|---|---|
| 7. | "Intuition" | 3:08 |
| 8. | "Out the Blue" | 3:23 |
| 9. | "Only People" | 3:23 |
| 10. | "I Know (I Know)" | 3:49 |
| 11. | "You Are Here" | 4:08 |
| 12. | "Meat City" | 2:45 |
| Total length: | | 40:41 |

2002 reissue bonus tracks
| No. | Title | Length |
|---|---|---|
| 13. | "Aisumasen (I'm Sorry)" (home version) | 3:35 |
| 14. | "Bring on the Lucie (Freda Peeple)" (home version) | 1:02 |
| 15. | "Meat City" (home version) | 2:36 |
| Total length: | | 47:54 |

== Personnel ==
Personnel per album sleeve and Bruce Spizer.

- John Lennon – lead, harmony and backing vocals, electric guitar, acoustic guitar, slide guitar, clavinet, Mellotron, electric piano, conga, tambourine, maracas, güiro, handclaps
- David Spinozza – electric guitar, acoustic guitar on "Out the Blue"
- Gordon Edwards – bass guitar
- Ken Ascher – piano, organ, reed organ, electric piano, Mellotron
- Jim Keltner – drums, cowbell
- Rick Marotta – drums on "Meat City" (with Keltner) and bongos on "Bring on the Lucie"
- Michael Brecker – saxophone
- Sneaky Pete Kleinow – pedal steel guitar
- Something Different (Christine Wiltshire, Jocelyn Brown, Kathy Mull, Angel Coakley) – backing vocals
- Roy Cicala, Dan Barbiero – engineers
- Tom Rabstanek – mastering

== Charts ==
=== Weekly charts ===
1973–1974 weekly chart performance for Mind Games
| Chart (1973–1974) | Peak position |
|---|---|
| Australian Kent Music Report Chart | 8 |
| Canadian RPM Albums Chart | 28 |
| Dutch Mega Albums Chart | 7 |
| Italian Albums (Musica e dischi) | 14 |
| Japanese Oricon LPs Chart | 6 |
| Norwegian VG-lista Albums Chart | 7 |
| Spanish Albums Chart | 9 |
| UK Albums Chart | 13 |
| US Billboard 200 | 9 |

2024 weekly chart performance for Mind Games
| Chart (2024) | Peak position |
|---|---|
| Austrian Albums (Ö3 Austria) | 7 |
| Belgian Albums (Ultratop Flanders) | 28 |
| Belgian Albums (Ultratop Wallonia) | 30 |
| German Albums (Offizielle Top 100) | 6 |
| Spanish Albums (Promusicae) | 64 |
| Swiss Albums (Schweizer Hitparade) | 22 |
| UK Albums (Official Charts) | 39 |

=== Year-end charts ===
Year-end chart performance for Mind Games
| Chart (1974) | Position |
|---|---|
| Australian Albums Chart | 34 |
| Dutch Albums Chart | 51 |

== Certifications ==
Certifications for Mind Games
| Region | Certification | Certified units/sales |
|---|---|---|
| United Kingdom (BPI) | Gold | 100,000^{^} |
| United States (RIAA) | Gold | 500,000^{^} |
^{^} Shipments figures based on certification alone.
