= Mind Games (John Lennon song) =

1973 single by John Lennon

Single by John Lennon

from the album Mind Games
- B-side: "Meat City"
- Released: 29 October 1973 (US); 16 November 1973 (UK)
- Recorded: July–August 1973
- Genre: Psychedelic rock; chamber rock
- Length: 4:13
- Label: Apple
- Songwriter: John Lennon
- Producer: John Lennon

John Lennon singles chronology
| "Woman Is the Nigger of the World" (1972) | "Mind Games" (1973) | "Whatever Gets You thru the Night" (1974) |

Official video
- "Mind Games" on YouTube

Mind Games track listing
- 12 tracks Side one: 1. "Mind Games"; 2. "Tight A$"; 3. "Aisumasen (I'm Sorry)"; 4. "One Day (At a Time)"; 5. "Bring on the Lucie (Freeda Peeple)"; 6. "Nutopian International Anthem"; Side two: 7. "Intuition"; 8. "Out the Blue"; 9. "Only People"; 10. "I Know (I Know)"; 11. "You Are Here"; 12. "Meat City"

"Mind Games" is a song written and performed by John Lennon, released as a single in 1973 on Apple Records. It was the lead single for the album of the same name. The US single and album were released simultaneously on 29 October 1973. The UK single and album were issued simultaneously on 16 November 1973. In the US it peaked at No. 18 on the Billboard Hot 100 and No. 10 on the Cashbox Top 100. In the UK it peaked at No. 26.

== Background ==
This song, which began in 1969 and can be heard in the Beatles' Let It Be sessions, was originally titled "Make Love, Not War", a popular anti-war slogan at that time. Another song, "I Promise", contains the melody that would later appear on "Mind Games". The original Lennon demos for "Make Love, Not War" and "I Promise", recorded in 1970, are available on the John Lennon Anthology. Lennon finished writing the song after reading the book Mind Games: The Guide to Inner Space by Robert Masters and Jean Houston (1972). Lennon later encountered Masters in a restaurant and told him, "I am one of your fans. You wrote Mind Games."

This eloquent track evoked lingering hippie sentiments mixed with the evolving mysticism of the early 1970s. In keeping with the original theme, the lyrics advocate unity, love, and a positive outlook. According to Billboard, the song asserts "that positive thoughts are the answer to happiness. The lyric "Yes is the answer" is a nod to his wife Yoko Ono's art piece that brought them together originally. The song's recording coincides with Lennon splitting with his wife and beginning his 18-month "lost weekend" with May Pang.

Cash Box said that "top flight vocal performance backed by that steady, yet driving, tempo accentuates some great lyrics, all in making for a great song." Record World called it "one of [Lennon's] best songs in the post-Beatle period."

== Personnel ==
According to John Lennon's official website and the Mind Games album booklet:

- John Lennon – vocals, slide guitar, Clavinet, Mellotron, tambourine, maracas
- David Spinozza – electric guitar
- Ken Ascher – pianos, organ, reed organ
- Gordon Edwards – bass guitar
- Jim Keltner – drums

== Chart performance ==
=== Weekly charts ===
| Chart (1973–74) | Peak position |
|---|---|
| Australia (Go-Set) | 8 |
| Australia (Kent Music Report) | 16 |
| Canadian RPM Top Singles | 11 |
| Canadian RPM Adult Contemporary | 70 |
| Germany | 37 |
| Italy (Musica e dischi) | 5 |
| Japan | 46 |
| Netherlands (Dutch Top 40) | 16 |
| UK Singles (OCC) | 26 |
| US Billboard Hot 100 | 18 |
| US Billboard Adult Contemporary | 33 |
| US Cash Box Top 100 | 10 |

=== Year-end charts ===
| Chart (1973) | Rank |
|---|---|
| Australia | 113 |
| Canada | 106 |

== Cover versions ==
In 1990 South African musician Ratau Mike Makhalemele released an EP of Lennon covers including a 16-minute-long version of Mind Games.

In 1995, it was recorded by George Clinton for the John Lennon tribute album Working Class Hero: A Tribute to John Lennon.

In 1997, it was recorded by DJ Krush with vocals by Eri Ohno for the album MiLight.

In 2001, Kevin Spacey performed the song during the tribute concert Come Together: A Night for John Lennon's Words and Music, shortly after 9/11.

The Irish band Hal covered Mind Games for Q Magazine in 2005.

In 2006, it was covered by German rock /pop group MIA., as well as Australian band, Eskimo Joe, as part of the project Make Some Noise to support Amnesty International. Eskimo Joe's cover would also appear on the International release of "Instant Karma: The Amnesty International Campaign to Save Darfur" as well as the Complete Recordings of the same project.

In 2007, Gavin Rossdale's version appeared on Instant Karma: The Amnesty International Campaign to Save Darfur as an iTunes exclusive bonus track.

In April 2009,, Sinéad O'Connor's version of the song recorded in the mid 1990s appeared on the re-released deluxe edition of her second album, I Do Not Want What I Haven't Got.

In 2017, Arcade Fire released a cover on Spotify, and performed the song multiple times live in concert.

In 2020, German singer-songwriter Niels Frevert covered Mind Games for the Rolling Stone magazine tribute album Lennon Re-imagined.

In June 2023, British band Noel Gallagher's High Flying Birds included a cover version as a bonus track on their album Council Skies.
