= David Spinozza =

American guitarist and producer (b. 1949)

- Born: David Alan Spinozza; August 8, 1949 (age 77); Port Chester, New York, U.S.
- Genres: Pop, rock, jazz
- Occupation: Musician
- Instrument: Guitar
- Years active: 1970-present

David Spinozza (born August 8, 1949) is an American guitarist and producer. He worked with former Beatles Paul McCartney, Ringo Starr and John Lennon during the 1970s, and had a long collaboration with singer-songwriter James Taylor, producing Taylor's album Walking Man.

== Career ==
Spinozza worked with McCartney during sessions for McCartney's Ram album during 1971. When the chance came to work with Lennon two years later, as Yoko Ono prepared her Feeling the Space album and Lennon his Mind Games, Spinozza discovered that Lennon was not aware he had previously worked with McCartney, and was afraid he would be fired if Lennon found out, given their recent feuding in the media. When Lennon did learn of it, his only comment was that McCartney "knows how to pick good people." The same story is related about Hugh McCracken.

Spinozza sessioned on Tim Weisberg's 1972 Hurtwood Edge and Cashman & West's 1974 Lifesong. Spinozza contributed to Ono's album A Story, recorded during 1974 (but not released until 1998), served as her bandleader during a residency at Kenny's Castaways, and rehearsed Ono's band to tour her native Japan, but parted ways with her when the tour began. After no communication for several years, Ono contacted Spinozza late in 1980, for his permission to release "It Happened", a track from A Story, as a B-side to "Walking on Thin Ice", her tribute to the recently assassinated John Lennon and the last song they had recorded together. Spinozza gave his permission. The track appeared with a new coda, recorded by Lennon and Ono's band from Double Fantasy.

Spinozza appeared on Ringo Starr's 1977 album Ringo the 4th, earning him the distinction of having recorded with three of the four Beatles.

Spinozza played acoustic guitar on the song "Honesty" on the 1978 Billy Joel album 52nd Street.

In 1978 he released Spinozza on the A&M label, a jazz-oriented album with some vocal tracks.

Spinozza played the guitar solo on Dr. John's hit, "Right Place, Wrong Time", played on Paul Simon's albums Paul Simon and There Goes Rhymin' Simon, Don McLean's American Pie, and later made contributions to the soundtracks of the movies Dead Man Walking, Happiness, and Just the Ticket. The first album David produced in its entirety was the folk rock trio Arthur, Hurley & Gottlieb who were signed by Clive Davis during his ten years as president of Columbia Records. Spinozza was a member of the Saturday Night Live band from 1980 to 1982. He also conducted the band in 1980 and 1981.

He held the first guitar chair in the Broadway orchestra of Hairspray and, in 2009, reunited with his band from 1973, L'Image, which also includes Mike Mainieri, Warren Bernhardt, Tony Levin and Steve Gadd.

== Selected discography ==
With Alessi Brothers

- All For a Reason (A&M, 1977)

With Peter Allen

- Continental American (A&M, 1974)
- I Could Have Been a Sailor (A&M, 1979)

With David Batteau

- Happy in Hollywood (A&M, 1976)

With Harry Belafonte

- Play Me (RCA Victor, 1973)

With George Benson

- In Your Eyes (Warner Bros., 1983)

With Stephen Bishop

- Red Cab to Manhattan (Warner Bros., 1980)

With Laura Branigan

- Over My Heart (Atlantic, 1993)

With James Brown

- Get on the Good Foot (Polydor, 1972)

With Rusty Bryant

- Until It's Time for You to Go (1974)

With Merry Clayton

- Keep Your Eye on the Sparrow (Ode, 1975)

With Marc Cohn

- Marc Cohn (Atlantic, 1991)

With Judy Collins

- Judith (Elektra, 1975)

With Elvis Costello

- Painted from Memory (Mercury, 1998)

With Jim Croce

- Life and Times (ABC, 1973)

With Lou Courtney

- I'm In Need of Love (Epic, 1974)

With Patti Dahlstrom

- The Way I Am (20th Century, 1973)

With Ron Davies

- U.F.O. (A&M, 1973)

With Richard Davis

- Dealin' (1973)

With John Denver

- Whose Garden Was This (RCA, 1970)

With Deodato

- Very Together (1976)

With Céline Dion

- Let's Talk About Love (Columbia, 1997)

With Craig Doerge

- Craig Doerge (Columbia, 1973)

With Yvonne Elliman

- Yvonne Elliman (Decca, 1972)

With Faith, Hope and Charity

- Faith, Hope & Charity (RCA Victor, 1975)
- Life Goes On (RCA Victor, 1976)

With Art Farmer

- Yama with Joe Henderson (1979)

With Jean-Pierre Ferland

- Jaune (1970)
- Soleil (1971)

With Roberta Flack and Donny Hathaway

- Roberta Flack & Donny Hathaway (Atlantic, 1972)

With Roberta Flack

- Feel Like Makin' Love (Atlantic, 1975)
- Blue Lights in the Basement (Atlantic, 1977)
- Roberta Flack (Atlantic, 1978)

With Aretha Franklin

- Let Me in Your Life (Atlantic, 1974)

With Michael Franks

- One Bad Habit (Warner Bros., 1980)
- Time Together (Shanachie, 2011)
- The Music in My Head (P-Vine, 2018)

With Richie Havens

- Connections (Elektra, 1980)

With Donny Hathaway

- Extension of a Man (Atco, 1973)

With Johnny Hodges

- 3 Shades of Blue (1970)

With Jennifer Holliday

- Say You Love Me (Geffen, 1985)
- Get Close to My Love (Geffen, 1987)

With Paul Jabara

- Paul Jabara & Friends (Columbia, 1983)

With Garland Jeffreys

- Ghost Writer (A&M, 1977)
- One-Eyed Jack (A&M, 1978)

With Billy Joel

- 52nd Street (Columbia, 1978)

With Dr. John

- In the Right Place (Atco, 1973)

With The Thad Jones/Mel Lewis Orchestra

- Consummation (1970)

With Margie Joseph

- Margie Joseph (Atlantic, 1973)
- Sweet Surrender (Atlantic, 1974)

With Patricia Kaas

- Dans ma chair (Columbia, 1997)

With Michael Kenny

- guitar on some tracks on self-titled Michael Kenny album (RCA, 1976)

With Robin Kenyatta

- Gypsy Man (1973)

With B. B. King

- B.B. King in London (ABC, 1971)

With Morgana King

- New Beginnings (Paramount Records, 1973)

With Labelle

- Labelle (Warner Bros., 1971)
- Moon Shadow (Warner Bros., 1972)

With Yusef Lateef

- Hush 'N' Thunder (1972)

With Donal Leace

- Donal Leace (Atlantic Records, 1972)

With John Lennon

- Mind Games (Apple, 1973)

With Johnny Lytle

- The Soulful Rebel (1971)

With Melissa Manchester

- Singin'... (Arista, 1977)
- Hey Ricky (Arista, 1982)

With Barry Manilow

- This One's for You (Arista, 1976)

With Herbie Mann

- Push Push (1971)
- Turtle Bay (1973)

With Arif Mardin

- Journey (1974)

With Charlie Mariano

- Mirror (1972)

With Percy Mayfield

- Blues... and Then Some (RCA Victor, 1971)

With Les McCann

- Invitation to Openness (1972)

With Paul McCartney

- Ram (Apple, 1971)

With Kate & Anna McGarrigle

- Kate & Anna McGarrigle (Warner Bros., 1976)
- Pronto Monto (Warner Bros., 1978)
- Entre la jeunesse et la sagesse (Rollo, 1980)

With Don McLean

- American Pie (United Artists, 1971)
- Homeless Brother (United Artists, 1974)

With Van McCoy

- Soul Improvisations (Buddah, 1972)
- Van McCoy and His Magnificent Move Machine (H&L, 1977)

With Bette Midler

- The Divine Miss M (Atlantic, 1972)
- Bette Midler (Atlantic, 1973)
- Songs for the New Depression (Atlantic, 1976)
- Thighs and Whispers (Atlantic, 1979)

With Stephanie Mills

- Stephanie (20th Century, 1981)

With Mark Murphy

- What a Way to Go (Muse, 1990)

With David "Fathead" Newman

- The Weapon (1973)

With Yoko Ono

- Feeling the Space (Apple, 1973)
- A Story (Rykodisc, 1997)

With Tony Orlando and Dawn

- To Be With You (Elektra, 1976)

With The Pointer Sisters

- Priority (Planet, 1979)

With David Pomeranz

- Time to Fly (Decca, 1971)

With Bonnie Raitt

- Streetlights (Warner Bros., 1974)

With Ray Repp

- Hear the Cryin (Myrrh, 1972)

With David Sanborn

- Heart to Heart (1978)

With Shirley Scott

- Superstition (1973)

With Gil Scott-Heron

- Free Will (Flying Dutchman, 1972)

With Carly Simon

- Spy (Elektra, 1979)
- Torch (Warner Bros., 1981)

With Lucy Simon

- Lucy Simon (RCA Victor, 1975)

With Paul Simon

- Paul Simon (Columbia, 1972)

With Bert Sommer

- Bert Sommer (Buddah, 1970)
- Bert Sommer (Capitol, 1977)

With Ringo Starr

- Ringo the 4th (Atlantic, 1977)

With Rod Stewart

- As Time Goes By: The Great American Songbook, Volume II (J, 2003)

With Howard Tate

- Howard Tate (Atlantic, 1972)

With James Taylor

- Walking Man (Warner Bros., 1974)

With Kate Taylor

- Kate Taylor (Columbia, 1978)

With Carla Thomas

- Memphis Queen (Stax, 1969)

With The Manhattan Transfer

- Tonin' (Atlantic, 1995)

With Frankie Valli

- Lady Put the Light Out (Private, 1977)

With Dionne Warwick

- Dionne Warwick Sings Cole Porter (Arista, 1990)

With Charles Williams

- Stickball (1972)

With Paul Williams

- Just an Old Fashioned Love Song (A&M Records, 1971)
- Life Goes On (A&M Records, 1972)

With Cris Williamson

- Cris Williamson (Ampex Records, 1971)

== Bibliography ==
- Pang, May. Loving John (Warner Books, 1982), ISBN 9780446379168
- The Editors of Rolling Stone. The Ballad of John and Yoko (Rolling Stone Press, 1982), ISBN 9780718122089
- Seaman, Frederic. The Last Days of John Lennon (Warner Books, 1991), ISBN 978-1559720847
