= Gimme Some Truth (box set) =

Box set by John Lennon
- Released: 5 October 2010
- Genre: Rock
- Length: 269:38
- Label: EMI
- Producers: IV Yoko Ono, EMI

John Lennon chronology
The U.S. vs. John Lennon (2006)	Gimme Some Truth (2010)	Power to the People: The Hits (2010)

Professional ratings
Review scores
Source	Rating
AllMusic	4/5 stars
Mojo	3/5 stars
Uncut	3/5 stars

Gimme Some Truth is a box set by English musician John Lennon, released in 2010 by EMI. It contains four themed discs of remastered songs. The box set was released along with John Lennon Signature Box box set and Power to the People: The Hits compilation in conjunction with what would have been Lennon's 70th birthday.

== Overview ==
The themes of Gimme Some Truth include "Working Class Hero", Lennon's socio-political songs; "Woman", Lennon's love songs; "Borrowed Time", his songs about life; and "Roots", his rock 'n' roll roots and influences. The collection features most of the tracks released on Lennon's studio albums, including in their entirety John Lennon/Plastic Ono Band and Rock n' Roll, and all but one track from Imagine. However, the tracks are not presented in album order.

== Track listing ==
All songs written and composed by John Lennon, except where noted.

=== Disc 1 (Working Class Hero) ===
1. "Working Class Hero" – 3:49
2. "Instant Karma! (We All Shine On)" – 3:25
3. "Power to the People" – 3:21
4. "God" – 4:11
5. "I Don't Wanna Be a Soldier" – 6:06
6. "Gimme Some Truth" – 3:14
7. "Sunday Bloody Sunday" (John Lennon/Yoko Ono) – 5:01
8. "Steel and Glass" – 4:39
9. "Meat City" – 2:52
10. "I Don't Wanna Face It" – 3:23
11. "Remember" – 4:35
12. "Woman Is the Nigger of the World" (Lennon/Ono) – 5:16
13. "I Found Out" – 3:37
14. "Isolation" – 2:53
15. "Imagine" (Lennon/Ono) – 3:04
16. "Happy Xmas (War Is Over)" (Ono/Lennon) – 3:33
17. "Give Peace a Chance" – 4:50
18. "Only People" – 3:27

=== Disc 2 (Woman) ===
1. "Mother" – 5:35
2. "Hold On" – 1:50
3. "You Are Here" – 4:09
4. "Well Well Well" – 5:57
5. "Oh My Love" (Lennon/Ono) – 2:46
6. "Oh Yoko!" – 4:17
7. "Grow Old with Me" (John Lennon) – 3:19
  - Anthology version
8. "Love" – 3:24
9. "Jealous Guy" – 4:16
10. "Woman" – 3:33
11. "Out the Blue" – 3:22
12. "Bless You" – 4:39
13. "Nobody Loves You (When You're Down and Out)" – 5:11
14. "My Mummy's Dead" – 0:49
15. "I'm Losing You" – 3:59
16. "(Just Like) Starting Over" – 3:58
17. "#9 Dream" – 4:46
18. "Beautiful Boy (Darling Boy)" – 4:06

=== Disc 3 (Borrowed Time) ===
1. "Mind Games" – 4:13
2. "Nobody Told Me" – 3:35
3. "Cleanup Time" – 2:57
4. "Crippled Inside" – 3:48
5. "How Do You Sleep?" – 5:36
6. "How?" – 3:43
7. "Intuition" – 3:07
8. "I'm Stepping Out" – 4:07
9. "Whatever Gets You Thru the Night" – 3:28
10. "Old Dirt Road" (John Lennon/Harry Nilsson) – 4:11
11. "Scared" – 4:39
12. "What You Got" – 3:08
13. "Cold Turkey" – 5:03
14. "New York City" – 4:31
15. "Surprise Surprise (Sweet Bird of Paradox)" – 2:55
16. "Borrowed Time" – 4:31
17. "Look at Me" – 2:54
18. "Watching the Wheels" – 3:32

=== Disc 4 (Roots) ===
1. "Be-Bop-A-Lula" (Tex Davis/Gene Vincent) – 2:37
2. "You Can't Catch Me" (Chuck Berry) – 4:52
3. "Rip It Up"/"Ready Teddy" (Bumps Blackwell/John Marascalco) – 1:34
4. "Tight A$" – 3:37
5. "Ain't That a Shame" (Fats Domino/Dave Bartholomew) – 2:32
6. "Sweet Little Sixteen" (Chuck Berry) – 3:02
7. "Do You Wanna Dance?" (Bobby Freeman) – 2:53
8. "Slippin' and Slidin'" (Eddie Bocage/Al Collins/Richard Penniman/James H. Smith) – 2:17
9. "Peggy Sue" (Jerry Allison, Norman Petty/Buddy Holly) – 2:05
10. "Bring It On Home to Me"/"Send Me Some Lovin'" (Sam Cooke)/(John Marascalco/Lloyd Price) – 3:40
11. "Yer Blues (Live)" (John Lennon/Paul McCartney) – 3:45
12. "Just Because" (Lloyd Price) – 4:29
13. "Bony Moronie" (Larry Williams) – 3:49
14. "Beef Jerky" – 3:27
15. "Ya Ya" (Lee Dorsey/Clarence Lewis/Morgan Robinson) – 2:20
16. "Hound Dog (Live)" (Jerry Leiber/Mike Stoller) – 3:05
17. "Stand by Me" (Ben E. King/Jerry Leiber/Mike Stoller) – 3:33
18. "Here We Go Again" (John Lennon/Phil Spector) – 4:51

== Charts ==
Chart (2010)	Peak position
Belgian Albums (Ultratop Flanders)	87
Belgian Heatseekers Albums (Ultratop Flanders)	14
Belgian Albums (Ultratop Wallonia)	39
Dutch Alternative Albums (MegaCharts)	30
French Albums (SNEP)	112
Spanish Albums (Promusicae)	100
US Billboard 200	196
