= Lennon (box set) =

Box set by John Lennon
- Released: 30 October 1990
- Recorded: June 1969 – autumn 1980
- Genre: Rock
- Length: 283:12
- Label: Parlophone/EMI
- Producers: John Lennon, Yoko Ono, Phil Spector, Jack Douglas, Gus Dudgeon

John Lennon chronology
Imagine: John Lennon (1988)	Lennon (1990)	Lennon Legend: The Very Best of John Lennon (1997)

Professional ratings
Review scores
Source	Rating
AllMusic	4.5/5 stars
MusicHound	4/5
The Rolling Stone Album Guide	4/5 stars

Lennon is a four-CD box set compilation, featuring highlights from the solo musical career of John Lennon. It was released in 1990 and is not to be confused with the 2015 box set of the same name, which comprised Lennon's eight original studio albums on vinyl LPs.

Compiled by Beatles historian Mark Lewisohn, Lennon includes his entire 1970 debut album John Lennon/Plastic Ono Band, selected tracks from his albums from Live Peace in Toronto 1969 through Menlove Ave., several non-album singles, live performances and other rarities.

Lennon never charted in the United Kingdom or United States and was deleted from Lennon's catalogue in the late 1990s.

== Track listing ==
- All songs composed by John Lennon, except where noted.

=== Disc one ===
No.	Title	Writer(s)	Album	Length
1.	"Give Peace a Chance"	John Lennon (Note: Originally credited to Lennon–McCartney, the credit was revised in the 1990s to reflect the fact that Lennon was the song's sole composer.)	Standalone single	4:53
2.	"Blue Suede Shoes"	Carl Perkins	Live Peace In Toronto 1969	2:38
3.	"Money"	Janie Bradford; Berry Gordy	Live Peace In Toronto 1969	3:25
4.	"Dizzy, Miss Lizzy"	Larry Williams	Live Peace In Toronto 1969	3:23
5.	"Yer Blues"	Lennon; Paul McCartney	Live Peace In Toronto 1969	3:42
6.	"Cold Turkey"		Standalone single	5:02
7.	"Instant Karma!"		Standalone single	3:23
8.	"Mother"		John Lennon/Plastic Ono Band	5:35
9.	"Hold On"		John Lennon/Plastic Ono Band	1:53
10.	"I Found Out"		John Lennon/Plastic Ono Band	3:37
11.	"Working Class Hero"		John Lennon/Plastic Ono Band	3:50
12.	"Isolation"		John Lennon/Plastic Ono Band	2:53
13.	"Remember"		John Lennon/Plastic Ono Band	4:36
14.	"Love"		John Lennon/Plastic Ono Band	3:24
15.	"Well Well Well"		John Lennon/Plastic Ono Band	5:59
16.	"Look at Me"		John Lennon/Plastic Ono Band	2:54
17.	"God"		John Lennon/Plastic Ono Band	4:10
18.	"My Mummy's Dead"		John Lennon/Plastic Ono Band	0:53
19.	"Power to the People"		Standalone single	3:18
20.	"Well (Baby Please Don't Go)"	Walter Ward	Some Time in New York City	3:56

=== Disc two ===
No.	Title	Writer(s)	Album	Length
1.	"Imagine"		Imagine	3:04
2.	"Crippled Inside"		Imagine	3:49
3.	"Jealous Guy"		Imagine	4:15
4.	"It's So Hard"		Imagine	2:26
5.	"Gimme Some Truth"		Imagine	3:16
6.	"Oh My Love"	Lennon; Yoko Ono	Imagine	2:45
7.	"How Do You Sleep?"		Imagine	5:36
8.	"How?"		Imagine	3:42
9.	"Oh Yoko!"		Imagine	4:19
10.	"Happy Xmas (War Is Over)"	Lennon; Ono	Standalone single	3:34
11.	"Woman Is the Nigger of the World"	Lennon; Ono	Some Time in New York City	5:15
12.	"New York City"		Some Time in New York City	4:29
13.	"John Sinclair"		Some Time in New York City	3:28
14.	"Come Together"	Lennon; McCartney	Abbey Road	4:25
15.	"Hound Dog"	Jerry Leiber; Mike Stoller	Live in New York City	3:02
16.	"Mind Games"		Mind Games	4:12
17.	"Aisumasen (I'm Sorry)"		Mind Games	4:44
18.	"One Day (At a Time)"		Mind Games	3:07
19.	"Intuition"		Mind Games	3:09
20.	"Out the Blue"		Mind Games	3:21

=== Disc three ===
No.	Title	Writer(s)	Album	Length
1.	"Whatever Gets You Thru the Night"		Walls and Bridges	3:25
2.	"Going Down on Love"		Walls and Bridges	3:54
3.	"Old Dirt Road"	Lennon; Harry Nilsson	Walls and Bridges	4:09
4.	"Bless You"		Walls and Bridges	4:37
5.	"Scared"		Walls and Bridges	4:39
6.	"#9 Dream"		Walls and Bridges	4:48
7.	"Surprise, Surprise (Sweet Bird of Paradox)"		Walls and Bridges	2:55
8.	"Steel and Glass"		Walls and Bridges	4:37
9.	"Nobody Loves You (When You're Down and Out)"		Walls and Bridges	5:10
10.	"Stand by Me"	Ben E. King; Leiber; Stoller	Rock 'n' Roll	3:28
11.	"Ain't That a Shame"	Fats Domino; Dave Bartholomew	Rock 'n' Roll	2:30
12.	"Do You Wanna Dance"	Bobby Freeman	Rock 'n' Roll	2:52
13.	"Sweet Little Sixteen"	Chuck Berry	Rock 'n' Roll	3:00
14.	"Slippin' and Slidin'"	Richard Penniman; Edwin Bocage; Al Collins; James H. Smith	Rock 'n' Roll	2:16
15.	"Angel Baby"	Rosie Hamlin	Rock 'n' Roll	3:39
16.	"Just Because"	Lloyd Price	Rock 'n' Roll	4:25
17.	"Whatever Gets You Thru the Night" (Live (Note: Recorded live at Elton John's Madison Square Garden show on 28 November 1974.))		"I Saw Her Standing There" (Elton John Band single)	4:19
18.	"Lucy in the Sky with Diamonds" (Live (Note: Recorded live at Elton John's Madison Square Garden show on 28 November 1974.))	Lennon; McCartney	"I Saw Her Standing There" (Elton John Band single)	5:58
19.	"I Saw Her Standing There" (Live (Note: Recorded live at Elton John's Madison Square Garden show on 28 November 1974.))	Lennon; McCartney	"I Saw Her Standing There" (Elton John Band single)	3:28

=== Disc four ===
No.	Title	Writer(s)	Album	Length
1.	"(Just Like) Starting Over"		Double Fantasy	3:56
2.	"Cleanup Time"		Double Fantasy	2:57
3.	"I'm Losing You"		Double Fantasy	3:56
4.	"Beautiful Boy (Darling Boy)"		Double Fantasy	4:01
5.	"Watching the Wheels"		Double Fantasy	3:31
6.	"Woman"		Double Fantasy	3:32
7.	"Dear Yoko"		Double Fantasy	2:33
8.	"I'm Stepping Out"		Milk and Honey	4:06
9.	"I Don't Wanna Face It"		Milk and Honey	3:21
10.	"Nobody Told Me"		Milk and Honey	3:33
11.	"Borrowed Time"		Milk and Honey	4:28
12.	"(Forgive Me) My Little Flower Princess"		Milk and Honey	2:27
13.	"Every Man Has a Woman Who Loves Him"	Ono	Every Man Has a Woman (Note: Originally released on Double Fantasy with Ono on lead vocals and Lennon on backing vocals, this remix features solo vocals from Lennon and was first released in 1984.)	3:31
14.	"Grow Old with Me"		Milk and Honey	3:07

== Charts ==
=== Weekly charts ===
Chart (1990)	Position
Australian ARIA Album Chart	39
Japanese Oricon Albums Chart	53

=== Certifications ===
Region	Certification
Japan (RIAJ)	Platinum
