= Working Class Hero: The Definitive Lennon =

Greatest hits album by John Lennon
- Released: 3 October 2005
- Recorded: 1969–1980, 1984
- Genre: Rock
- Length: 151:34
- Labels: Parlophone; Capitol; EMI
- Producers: John Lennon; Yoko Ono; Phil Spector; Jack Douglas

John Lennon chronology
Peace, Love & Truth (2005)	Working Class Hero: The Definitive Lennon (2005)	The US vs. John Lennon (2006)

Professional ratings
Review scores
Source	Rating
AllMusic	4.5/5 stars
PopMatters	8/10

Working Class Hero: The Definitive Lennon is a two-disc compilation of music by John Lennon, released in October 2005 on Capitol Records, catalogue CDP 0946 3 40391 2 3, in commemoration of what would have been his 65th birthday. The set contains remixed and remastered versions of his songs, overseen by widow Yoko Ono from 2000 to 2005.

== Overview ==
The 38 assembled tracks span his entire solo career, and contain every Lennon song released as a single with the exception of the posthumous "Every Man Has a Woman Who Loves Him", although not always the version or edit originally released as such. Representative tracks appear from all of his eight studio albums issued from 1970 to 1984, and the set contains all the songs featured on the previously released compilations Shaved Fish and Lennon Legend and all but one from The John Lennon Collection (Dear Yoko; "Move Over Ms. L," which was issued as a bonus track on the 1989 CD edition was also omitted), albeit at times in slightly different form. The bonus DVD included in Working Class Hero Deluxe Pack issued by EMI on 23 October 2008, is actually the Lennon Legend DVD.

== Reception ==
Working Class Hero: The Definitive Lennon was critically well-received upon its release and reached number 11 in the United Kingdom. It fared relatively poorly in the United States, debuting on the Billboard 200 album chart on 22 October at number 135, spending only three weeks on the chart.

== Track listing ==
All tracks are written by John Lennon, except where noted.

Disc 1
No.	Title	Original album	Length
1.	"(Just Like) Starting Over"	Double Fantasy (1980)	3:56
2.	"Imagine"	Imagine (1971)	3:02
3.	"Watching the Wheels"	Double Fantasy (1980)	3:30
4.	"Jealous Guy"	Imagine (1971)	4:14
5.	"Instant Karma!"	Non-album single (1970)	3:20
6.	"Stand by Me" (King/Leiber/Stoller)	Rock 'n' Roll (1975)	3:26
7.	"Working Class Hero"	John Lennon/Plastic Ono Band (1970)	3:48
8.	"Power to the People"	Non-album single (1971)	3:22
9.	"Oh My Love" (Lennon/Ono)	Imagine (1971)	2:44
10.	"Oh Yoko!"	Imagine (1971)	4:18
11.	"Nobody Loves You (When You're Down and Out)"	Walls and Bridges (1974)	5:07
12.	"Nobody Told Me"	Milk and Honey (1984)	3:34
13.	"Bless You"	Walls and Bridges (1974)	4:37
14.	"Come Together (Live)" (Lennon/McCartney)	Live in New York City (1986)	4:22
15.	"New York City"	Some Time in New York City (1972)	4:31
16.	"I'm Stepping Out"	Milk and Honey (1984)	4:06
17.	"You Are Here"	Mind Games (1973)	4:07
18.	"Borrowed Time"	Milk and Honey (1984)	4:29
19.	"Happy Xmas (War Is Over)" (Ono/Lennon)	Non-album single (1971)	3:37
Total length:			74:10

Disc 2
No.	Title	Original album	Length
1.	"Woman"	Double Fantasy (1980)	3:33
2.	"Mind Games"	Mind Games (1973)	4:12
3.	"Out the Blue"	Mind Games (1973)	3:22
4.	"Whatever Gets You Thru the Night"	Walls and Bridges (1974)	3:27
5.	"Love"	John Lennon/Plastic Ono Band (1970)	3:23
6.	"Mother"	John Lennon/Plastic Ono Band (1970)	5:34
7.	"Beautiful Boy (Darling Boy)"	Double Fantasy (1980)	4:01
8.	"Woman Is the Nigger of the World" (Lennon/Ono)	Some Time In New York City (1972)	5:16
9.	"God"	John Lennon/Plastic Ono Band (1970)	4:09
10.	"Scared"	Walls and Bridges (1974)	4:36
11.	"#9 Dream"	Walls and Bridges (1974)	4:46
12.	"I'm Losing You"	John Lennon Anthology (1998)	3:55
13.	"Isolation"	John Lennon/Plastic Ono Band (1970)	2:51
14.	"Cold Turkey"	Non-album single (1969)	5:01
15.	"Intuition"	Mind Games (1973)	3:08
16.	"Gimme Some Truth"	Imagine (1971)	3:15
17.	"Give Peace a Chance"	Non-album single (1969)	4:50
18.	"Real Love"	John Lennon Anthology (1998)	4:12
19.	"Grow Old with Me"	John Lennon Anthology (1998)	3:20
Total length:			76:51

== Charts ==
Chart (2005)	Peak position
Australian Albums (ARIA)	53
Austrian Albums (Ö3 Austria)	22
Belgian Albums (Ultratop Flanders)	31
Belgian Albums (Ultratop Wallonia)	75
Danish Albums (Hitlisten)	5
Dutch Albums (Album Top 100)	52
Finnish Albums (Suomen virallinen lista)	34
German Albums (Offizielle Top 100)	44
Irish Albums (IRMA)	21
Italian Albums (FIMI)	33
Mexican Albums (Top 100 Mexico)	86
Norwegian Albums (VG-lista)	13
Spanish Albums (Promusicae)	34
Swiss Albums (Schweizer Hitparade)	61
UK Albums (Official Charts)	11
US Billboard 200	135

== Certifications ==
Certifications for Working Class Hero: The Definitive Lennon
Region	Certification	Certified units/sales
Canada (Music Canada)	Gold	50,000^{^}
Denmark (IFPI Danmark)	Platinum	40,000^{^}
Ireland (IRMA)	Gold	7,500^{^}
United Kingdom (BPI)	Gold	100,000^{^}
^{^} Shipments figures based on certification alone.
