= Surprise, Surprise (Sweet Bird of Paradox) =

Song by John Lennon

from the album Walls and Bridges
- Released: 26 September 1974
- Recorded: July–August 1974
- Length: 2:55
- Label: Apple
- Songwriter: John Lennon
- Producer: John Lennon

Walls and Bridges track listing
- 12 tracks Side one: 1. "Going Down on Love"; 2. "Whatever Gets You thru the Night"; 3. "Old Dirt Road"; 4. "What You Got"; 5. "Bless You"; 6. "Scared"; Side two: 7. "#9 Dream"; 8. "Surprise, Surprise (Sweet Bird of Paradox)"; 9. "Steel and Glass"; 10. "Beef Jerky"; 11. "Nobody Loves You (When You're Down and Out)"; 12. "Ya Ya"

"Surprise, Surprise (Sweet Bird of Paradox)" is a song written by John Lennon that was first released on his 1974 album Walls and Bridges. Elton John contributes harmony vocals to the song.

== Lyrics and music ==
"Surprise, Surprise (Sweet Bird of Paradox)" was the first song Lennon wrote for Walls and Bridges. While other songs on the album were inspired by Lennon's feelings towards his then estranged wife Yoko Ono, "Surprise, Surprise (Sweet Bird of Paradox)" was inspired by his feelings towards his then lover May Pang, and how she helped him through that difficult period. The term "sweet bird of paradox" in the title is a play on the term "bird of paradise" and refers to the paradox that Lennon had originally intended Pang to be a placeholder while he was separated from Ono but she became important to him. While the final version of the song reflects Lennon's happiness with his relationship with Pang, the earliest versions of the song had him questioning the strength of this relationship.

Music critic Johnny Rogan suggested that although "Surprise, Surprise (Sweet Bird of Paradox)" is a love song to May Pang, it contains hints that the relationship is merely functional and that the line "She makes me sweat and forget who I am" suggests that Pang "deadens [Lennon's] true feelings. Music lecturers Ben Urish and Ken Bielen claim that in contrast to expressing the "dawning realization that love was meant to be", as in Lennon's earlier song "Out the Blue", in "Surprise, Surprise (Sweet Bird of Paradox)" Lennon expresses the "sudden astonishment of self-centered lust." They explain that Lennon does this by using "marginally connected phrases to approximate the excitement that causes the thoughts to leap ahead of themselves, and their expression to be disrupted as a result." Urish and Bielen give as examples the phrases "Natural high...butterfly," "Just like a willow tree...a breath of spring," and "A bird of paradise...sunrise in her eyes."

An inspiration for the music of the song was the Diamonds' 1957 hit "Little Darlin'". As the song fades out, Lennon sings "sweet, sweet, sweet, sweet love" to a tune similar to that to which the Beatles sang "Beep, beep! Beep, beep, yeah!" during the fadeout of "Drive My Car."

Elton John was originally intended to sing the vocals as a duet with Lennon, but struggled to match Lennon's phrasing. He expressed the frustration of his efforts, saying "People were leaving the room. Razor blades were being passed out!” Lennon ended up overdubbing Elton John's harmony vocals onto the middle eight. A horn part was also overdubbed.

== Reception ==
Rolling Stone critic Ben Gerson said that "Surprise, Surprise (Sweet Bird of Paradox)" shows that "Lennon is resilient and can still love," but in doing so contradict the themes of other songs on Walls and Bridges, in which Lennon claims to be in great pain. Lennon eventually came to regard the song as "Just a piece of garbage," although Rogan points out that this assessment may have been motivated by the fact that he was back with Ono by that time.

== Personnel ==
The musicians who played on the original recording of "Surprise, Surprise (Sweet Box of Paradox) were:

- John Lennon – vocals
- Eddie Mottau – acoustic guitar
- Klaus Voormann – bass
- Ken Ascher – clavinet
- Jim Keltner – drums
- Jesse Ed Davis – guitar
- Elton John – harmony vocals
- Little Big Horns (Bobby Keys, Steve Madaio, Howard Johnson, Ron Aprea & Frank Vicari) – horns
- Arthur Jenkins – percussion
- Nicky Hopkins – piano

== Alternate version ==
An early version of "Surprise, Surprise (Sweet Bird of Paradox)" was released on the 1998 compilation album John Lennon Anthology. Beatle biographers Chip Madinger and Mark Easter prefer the Anthology version due to lacking Elton John's harmony vocal, which they view as "clumsy", having a faster tempo, and a more prominent clavinet part.
