= Beef Jerky (instrumental) =

1974 Instrumental by John Lennon

Single by John Lennon

from the album Walls and Bridges
- A-side: "Whatever Gets You thru the Night"
- Released: 23 September 1974 (US); 4 October 1974 (UK)
- Recorded: 1974
- Length: 3:25
- Label: Apple
- Songwriters: John Lennon
- Producer: John Lennon

Walls and Bridges track listing
- 12 tracks Side one: 1. "Going Down on Love"; 2. "Whatever Gets You thru the Night"; 3. "Old Dirt Road"; 4. "What You Got"; 5. "Bless You"; 6. "Scared"; Side two: 7. "#9 Dream"; 8. "Surprise, Surprise (Sweet Bird of Paradox)"; 9. "Steel and Glass"; 10. "Beef Jerky"; 11. "Nobody Loves You (When You're Down and Out)"; 12. "Ya Ya"

"Beef Jerky" is an instrumental written by John Lennon that was released on his 1974 album Walls and Bridges and also as the B-side of the lead single from that album, the number-one hit "Whatever Gets You thru the Night."

== Music ==
Beatle historian Bruce Spizer describes "Beef Jerky" as a "funky instrumental." "Beef Jerky" developed during the recording sessions for "#9 Dream" from variations Lennon composed based on the music of two songs from Lennon's previous album Mind Games, "Tight A$" and "Meat City." In a nod to his old partner, it also contains a riff that replicates one from Paul McCartney's "Let Me Roll It," which was a song McCartney wrote in a "Lennon style." Uncut contributor David Cavanagh believes Lennon meant no offense by using this riff, and simply "nicked it" because he liked it. The sound of "Beef Jerky" was inspired by the early rhythm and blues songs." At one point during the song's bridge, there is a chorus calling out the song's title "beef jerky" several times mimicking The Bar-kays similar bridge in their instrumental hit "Soul Finger". Lennon acknowledged its debt to earlier rhythm and blues and soul music by including a credit to "Booker Table and the Maitre D's," a pun on Booker T and the MGs. The title comes from the dried meat strips that Lennon and then-girlfriend May Pang used to eat in the recording studio.

Lennon said of the song "I like this one because I don't sing, and I can stand listening to it without hearing me voice all the time."

== Reception ==
Music critic Johnny Rogan claims that the horn playing of "Beef Jerky" by Bobby Keys and others is a good imitation of the Stax Records sound, particularly that of The Mar-Keys and Bar-Kays. He also praises the guitar interplay between Lennon and Jesse Ed Davis. Music lecturers Ben Urish and Ken Bielen describe the song as "a brass-laden rocker that moves through rhythmic variations and distinctive horn riffs with aplomb and ease. Music critic Tim Riley calls the song a "juicy instrumental" that helps give Walls and Bridges a "rocker's pulse."

Beatle biographer John Blaney states that although Lennon incorporates a clever production and a good horn arrangement, he finds the song to be "pedestrian." Blaney particularly criticizes the decision to put the rhythm section low in the mix, but like Rogan he praises Lennon's and Davis' guitar playing. Beatle historians Chip Madinger and Mark Easter call the song "a somewhat pointless instrumental," and felt that like "What You Got," which would be Lennon's next b-side, it doesn't go anywhere after the opening verse. Allmusic critic Stephen Thomas Erlewine considers it "mediocre."

Music journalist Paul Du Noyer finds the song to be "nothing special — just an efficiently funky, bustling rocker" but notes that it plays an important role on Walls and Bridges by relieving some of the tension on the album between "the cold-hearted masterpiece of invective" "Steel and Glass" and what he considers "the most tortured track" on the album, "Nobody Loves You (When You're Down and Out)." Urish and Bielen agree that the instrumental serves as an important role on the album as a "palette cleanser" between those two songs.

== Personnel ==
The musicians who played on "Beef Jerky" were:

- John Lennon – guitar
- Jesse Ed Davis – guitar
- Klaus Voormann – bass
- Jim Keltner – drums
- Arthur Jenkins – percussion
- Little Big Horns (Bobby Keys, Frank Vicari, Howard Johnson, Ron Aprea, Steve Madaio) – horns
