= Going Down on Love =

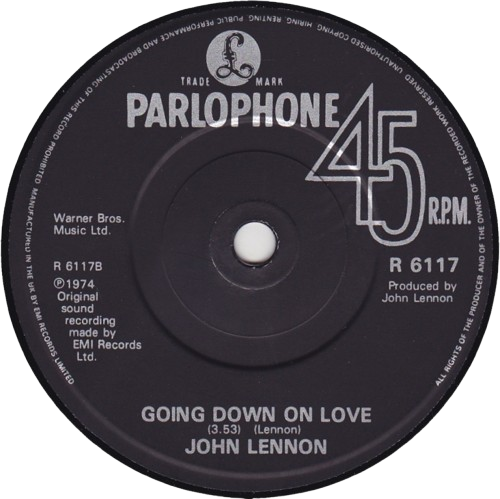
- B-side label of the 1985 UK single

Song by John Lennon

from the album Walls and Bridges
- Released: 26 September 1974
- Recorded: 1974
- Genre: Rock
- Length: 3:54
- Label: Apple Records
- Songwriter: John Lennon
- Producer: John Lennon

Walls and Bridges track listing
- 12 tracks Side one: 1. "Going Down on Love"; 2. "Whatever Gets You thru the Night"; 3. "Old Dirt Road"; 4. "What You Got"; 5. "Bless You"; 6. "Scared"; Side two: 7. "#9 Dream"; 8. "Surprise, Surprise (Sweet Bird of Paradox)"; 9. "Steel and Glass"; 10. "Beef Jerky"; 11. "Nobody Loves You (When You're Down and Out)"; 12. "Ya Ya"

"Going Down on Love" is a song by John Lennon, released as the first track on his 1974 album Walls and Bridges. It was also released as the B-side of Lennon's "Jealous Guy" single on 18 November 1985 in the United Kingdom.

== Lyrics & music ==
The lyrics of "Going Down on Love" reflect Lennon's feelings during his so-called "lost weekend" separation from wife Yoko Ono. As such, it sets the tone for the entire Walls and Bridges album. Lennon laments the fact that even though his life at the time looked like fun, he actually needed to be rescued from his pleasure seeking, loveless situation. The singer accepts his loss of his "precious and rare" love as the price for his past abuses. Authors Chip Madinger and Mark Easter describe the lyrics as being as frank as the lyrics of the songs on John Lennon/Plastic Ono Band. Ben Urish and Ken Bielen describe the lyrics as "bleak."

The title phrase incorporates a sexual pun. The phrase "going down on love" is used in the song in the context of "giving up on love." He even adds that he "got to get down, down on my knees," which in a literal sense would mean he is on his knees pleading for help or begging for forgiveness. But these phrases also imply a sexual act, although part of the joke seems to be that within the song neither the stated romantic longings or the implied sexual desires are fulfilled. Andrew Jackson, however, takes the title phrase combined with the pun to imply a promise by Lennon to be a better lover if Ono takes him back.

"Going Down on Love" opens with a percussion accompaniment that author Andrew Jackson compares to Marvin Gaye's "What's Going On" and "Mercy Mercy Me (The Ecology)," albeit slower. The song alternates between slow, smooth sections and sections with a funky rhythm punctuated by bongo drums. Urish and Bielen believe that this approach generates a "feeling of nervous energy," which they consider appropriate to the song's anxious and resigned mood. Although it is a "song of loss," music critic Johnny Rogan states that the "jaunty tone" of the song produces an effect of irreverence and defiance. Rogan finds the two most notable elements of the song are Lennon's "strident" vocal and Bobby Keys' horn arrangement. The phrase "Somebody please, please help me" is sung to a similar melody, albeit at a slower tempo as the similar phrase Lennon sang in the Beatles' song "Help!"

According to Madinger and Easter, the recording and mixing of "Going Down on Love" are crisper than on many other Lennon songs.

== Reception ==
Rock journalist Paul Du Noyer notes the irony that although the lyrics contain the line "Nothing doin' nowhere," in a creative sense there was more going on here and throughout the Walls and Bridges album than on Lennon's recordings in recent happier times. Author John Blaney notes that the song is "as raw and honest as anything [Lennon had] written," adding that Lennon was often at his best creatively when dealing with difficulties. Madinger and Easter call it a "terrific LP opener."

== Personnel ==
The musicians who performed on the original recording were as follows:

- John Lennon – vocals, guitar
- Nicky Hopkins – piano
- Jesse Ed Davis – electric guitar
- Eddie Mottau – acoustic guitar
- Ken Ascher – electric piano
- Klaus Voormann – bass
- Arthur Jenkins – percussion
- Jim Keltner – drums
- Bobby Keys, Steve Madaio, Howard Johnson, Ron Aprea, Frank Vicari – horns
