= What You Got (John Lennon song) =

Single by John Lennon

from the album Walls and Bridges
- A-side: "#9 Dream"
- Released: 16 December 1974
- Recorded: July–August 1974
- Genre: Funk rock
- Length: 3:06
- Label: Apple
- Songwriter: John Lennon
- Producer: John Lennon

Walls and Bridges track listing
- 12 tracks Side one: 1. "Going Down on Love"; 2. "Whatever Gets You thru the Night"; 3. "Old Dirt Road"; 4. "What You Got"; 5. "Bless You"; 6. "Scared"; Side two: 7. "#9 Dream"; 8. "Surprise, Surprise (Sweet Bird of Paradox)"; 9. "Steel and Glass"; 10. "Beef Jerky"; 11. "Nobody Loves You (When You're Down and Out)"; 12. "Ya Ya"

"What You Got" is a song written by John Lennon that was first released on his 1974 album Walls and Bridges. It was later released as the B-side to his top 10 "#9 Dream" single.

== Lyrics and music ==
The lyrics of "What You Got" reflect Lennon being upset at being separated from wife Yoko Ono at the time, during his "lost weekend." This is particularly the case of the refrain of "You don't know what you got until you lose it." Lennon acknowledged that this is the case, stating that "Well, that's talkin’ about Yoko. You really don't know what you got till you lose it." The lyrics are peppered with other cliches, including more reassuring ones such as "You gotta hang on in," and the refrain ends with the phrase "give me one more chance." One line, "Well it's Saturday night and I just gotta rip it up" recalls Little Richard's song "Rip It Up" but unlike Little Richard, Lennon is not looking to celebrate Saturday night but rather expressing his anxiety about his personal situation and lamenting the time he has wasted getting drunk to try to forget about it.

Music lecturers Ben Urish and Ken Bielen describe "What You Got" as a "blues-tinged rocker with more than a little Latin funk thrown in." The music to "What You Got" was influenced by dance music. It recalls the O'Jays' song "For the Love of Money." Music critic Johnny Rogan sees it as a mixture between Sly Stone, The Isley Brothers and Tamla Motown. Beatle historians Chip Madinger and Mark Easter feel that it sounds like a Commodores song. The song is taken at a fast pace. Beatle historian Bruce Spizer likens the pace to that of the Beatles' "Everybody's Got Something to Hide Except Me and My Monkey." Beatle biographer John Blaney states that while the music sounds "up-beat" it is "honest and self-explanatory" below the surface. Urish and Bielen interpret that "the taut rush of the song implies that the singer is trying to run away from himself," an interpretation that is supported by the line "I've just got to run away / It's such a drag to face another day."

== Reception ==
Blaney states that "What You Got" "may not have much to say lyrically, but it said it musically in the most fashionable way possible." Du Noyer similarly states that it is "short on poetry, but it's satisfyingly stuffed with drama." Rogan states that "although the party atmosphere suggests one long drinking binge, neither the musicianship not the arrangement is noticeably slack," going on to say that this song sounds better than most of the songs on Lennon's previous album Mind Games. Communications professor Michael Frontani calls it one of Lennon's best vocal performances.

On the other hand, New Musical Express critics Roy Carr and Tony Tyler state that the song "begins as a promising rocker, but by middle-eight time a routine quality has begun to set in and the overall arthritic effect is overpowering, despite the anticipatory oomph of the first eight bars." Madinger and Easter similarly state that the song "doesn't seem to go anywhere after the first verse and chorus," but they do praise the "rhythm backing." Allmusic critic Stephen Thomas Erlewine considers it a "middling rocker" that replicates the "bright, sunny surface" of the big hit from Walls and Bridges, "Whatever Gets You thru the Night."

Far Out critic Tim Coffman rated it as Lennon's 8th greatest deep cut, calling it "a portrait of a man lost without the love of his life" and saying "Set to an early rock and roll shuffle, Lennon turns in a performance which feels like the hardcore equivalent of an early 1960s pop rock song, howling in frustration as the gentle staccato guitars follow his every word."

== Personnel ==
The performers on "What You Got" were:

- John Lennon – vocals, electric guitar
- Jesse Ed Davis – electric guitar
- Eddie Mottau – acoustic guitar
- Nicky Hopkins – piano
- Ken Ascher – clavinet
- Klaus Voormann – bass
- Jim Keltner – drums
- Arthur Jenkins – percussion
- The Little Big Horns (Bobby Keys, Steve Madaio, Howard Johnson, Ron Aprea & Frank Vicari) – brass instruments

== Alternate version ==
A 1:15 long edit of a demo of the song was issued on John Lennon Anthology. Lennon plays this version on an unplugged electric guitar.
