= Steel and Glass =

Song by John Lennon

from the album Walls and Bridges
- Published: Lennon Music/ATV Music
- Released: 26 September 1974
- Recorded: July – August 1974
- Genre: Rock, folk rock
- Length: 4:37
- Label: Apple
- Songwriter: John Lennon
- Producer: John Lennon

Walls and Bridges track listing
- 12 tracks Side one: 1. "Going Down on Love"; 2. "Whatever Gets You thru the Night"; 3. "Old Dirt Road"; 4. "What You Got"; 5. "Bless You"; 6. "Scared"; Side two: 7. "#9 Dream"; 8. "Surprise, Surprise (Sweet Bird of Paradox)"; 9. "Steel and Glass"; 10. "Beef Jerky"; 11. "Nobody Loves You (When You're Down and Out)"; 12. "Ya Ya"

"Steel and Glass" is a song written and performed by John Lennon, released on his 1974 album Walls and Bridges. A dark folk song, it has been interpreted as an attack on Lennon's former business manager Allen Klein but others argue Lennon was in fact addressing the song to himself, in a similar fashion to the Beatles' track "Nowhere Man".

The song contains a lick performed by violins and horns in the chorus that is reminiscent of Lennon's song "How Do You Sleep?", an attack on his former Beatles bandmate Paul McCartney.

== Recording ==
In 1973, before work began on Mind Games, John Lennon recorded an acoustic demo of "Steel and Glass". While Lennon's ideas were taking shape, it was largely based on a single piano chord – from the final studio recording. Before recording Walls and Bridges in July 1974, Lennon spent around 10 days in pre-production at Sunset Studios and Record Plant East, New York. During this time he rehearsed a few songs with the musicians he had recruited for the sessions.

Lennon admitted to a Detroit radio station, during an interview in 1974, that he reused "licks" from a certain song, in response to the interviewer bringing up the similarity of "Steel and Glass", and what he was wondering could be a second part to the Paul McCartney dig "How Do You Sleep?"

== Release ==
An alternative take of "Steel and Glass" was included on the posthumous collection Menlove Ave., released in 1986. Take 8 was released on the 1998 box set John Lennon Anthology. Take 9 was the master used for Walls and Bridges.

== Reception ==
In a contemporary mixed review for Walls and Bridges, Ben Gerson of Rolling Stone found "Steel and Glass" "boring and needless" but added that "its unalloyed hatred is peculiarly compatible with the optimism of '#9 Dream' and 'Surprise, Surprise'". Writing for the same magazine in 2010, David Fricke named "Steel and Glass" as one of Lennon's most underappreciated songs, stating that the strings sound "like piercing needles" and "the phasing on Lennon's voice makes him sound like a hissing snake".

Stephen Thomas Erlewine of AllMusic called "Steel and Glass" one of the "best moments" on Walls and Bridges, praising how Lennon opens up with his emotions on the song.

== Covers ==
The song was covered by American rock band Candlebox on the tribute album Working Class Hero: A Tribute to John Lennon. Anglo-Swedish rock band Alberta Cross have also covered the song.

== Personnel ==
The musicians who performed on the original recording were as follows:

- John Lennon – vocals, acoustic guitar
- Nicky Hopkins – piano
- Jesse Ed Davis – electric guitar
- Eddie Mottau – acoustic guitar
- Ken Ascher – clavinet
- Klaus Voormann – bass
- Arthur Jenkins – percussion
- Jim Keltner – drums
- Bobby Keys, Steve Madaio, Howard Johnson, Ron Aprea, Frank Vicari – horns
