= Acoustic (John Lennon album) =

Compilation album by John Lennon
- Released: 1 November 2004
- Recorded: 1969–1980
- Genre: Rock
- Length: 44:00
- Label: Capitol/EMI
- Producer: Yoko Ono

John Lennon chronology
Instant Karma: All-Time Greatest Hits (2002)	Acoustic (2004)	Peace, Love & Truth (2005)

Acoustic is a compilation album of John Lennon demos, studio and live performances that feature his acoustic guitar work and was released in 2004.

== Overview ==
The compilation consist of the 9 tracks previously released on John Lennon Anthology box set and 7 previously unreleased tracks.

In keeping with the overall theme of the album, the booklet contains the lyrics and guitar chords for each track, as well as a chord index on the last page.

== Reception ==
Professional ratings
Review scores
Source	Rating
AllMusic	2.5/5 stars
Boston Phoenix	4/4 stars
The Music Box	3/5 stars
Pitchfork Media	7.1/10

The album received much criticism from both critics and fans, as most of the album had previously been released on the 1998 John Lennon Anthology box set, while the remaining recordings had been available on several different bootleg CDs for years.

Although it failed to chart in the United Kingdom, Acoustic reached number 31 in the United States with sales of 27,858 copies, becoming John Lennon's best charting posthumous US release since 1988's Imagine: John Lennon soundtrack. It spent eight weeks on the chart.

== Track listing ==
All tracks written by John Lennon, except where noted.

1. "Working Class Hero" – 3:58
2. "Love" – 2:30
3. "Well Well Well" – 1:14
4. "Look at Me" – 2:49
5. "God" – 2:38
6. "My Mummy's Dead" – 1:13
7. "Cold Turkey" – 3:26
8. "The Luck of the Irish" (Lennon/Yoko Ono) – 3:41
9. "John Sinclair" – 3:22
  - Tracks 8–9 recorded live on 10 December 1971 in Ann Arbor, Michigan
10. "Woman Is the Nigger of the World" (Lennon/Ono) – 0:39
11. "What You Got" – 2:24
12. "Watching the Wheels" – 3:04
13. "Dear Yoko" – 4:05
14. "Real Love" – 4:00
15. "Imagine" (Lennon/Ono) – 3:08
  - Recorded live on 17 December 1971 at the Apollo Theater, Manhattan, New York City, New York
16. "It's Real" – 1:04

== Recording notes ==
- Tracks 1–2, 4, 8–10, 12 & 15–16 first released on John Lennon Anthology "Reviews: Acoustic". Bagism. 13 March 2011.
- Tracks 1–6 taken from 8-track John Lennon/Plastic Ono Band sessions (1970) "John Lennon – Acoustic". Uncut. 13 December 2004.
- Track 7 taken from home demo September 1969 Nat, Happy (25 November 2010). "Beatles Rarity Of The Week (extra!) – "Cold Turkey" (1969 demo)". The Beatles Rarity. Archived from the original on 18 February 2015.
- Tracks 8 & 9 taken from John Sinclair benefit concert (1971) "Solo Gigs". Norwegian Wood. 10 February 2009. Archived from the original on 20 February 2015.
- Track 10 taken from home recording (1972)
- Track 11 taken from June 1974 work-outs "John Lennon – Acoustic". Uncut. 13 December 2004.
- Tracks 12–14 taken from home recordings (1980) "John Lennon – Acoustic". Uncut. 13 December 2004.
- Track 15 taken from live performance at the Apollo (1971) "Solo Gigs". Norwegian Wood. 10 February 2009. Archived from the original on 20 February 2015.
- Track 16 taken from home recordings (1979)
