= Scared (John Lennon song) =

Song by John Lennon

from the album Walls and Bridges
- Released: 26 September 1974
- Recorded: July–August 1974
- Length: 4:36
- Label: Apple
- Songwriter: John Lennon
- Producer: John Lennon

Walls and Bridges track listing
- 12 tracks Side one: 1. "Going Down on Love"; 2. "Whatever Gets You thru the Night"; 3. "Old Dirt Road"; 4. "What You Got"; 5. "Bless You"; 6. "Scared"; Side two: 7. "#9 Dream"; 8. "Surprise, Surprise (Sweet Bird of Paradox)"; 9. "Steel and Glass"; 10. "Beef Jerky"; 11. "Nobody Loves You (When You're Down and Out)"; 12. "Ya Ya"

"Scared" is a song written by John Lennon that was first released on his 1974 album Walls and Bridges. Alternate versions were subsequently released on the compilation albums Menlove Ave. and John Lennon Anthology.

== Lyrics and music ==
The lyrics to "Scared" reflect Lennon's anxieties resulting from his separation at the time from his wife Yoko Ono. The theme is similar to that of his Beatles' song "Help!", in that it expresses the pain Lennon was feeling at the time of its writing and exposes his insecurities. According to music critic Johnny Rogan, among those insecurities are aging, passing of time and lost opportunities. Some of the lyrics renounce the "peace and love" philosophy he had adhered to previously.

Lennon starts the first verse by singing "I'm scared" several times. In the second verse he changes this to "I'm scarred" and in the third verse he changes it to "I'm tired". Lennon invokes the phrase "bell, book, and candle" to state that religion cannot help him out of his plight. He also references Bob Dylan's "Like a Rolling Stone", singing that he has "No place to call my own/Like a rollin' stone."

Music lecturers Ben Urish and Ken Bielen describe the first verse as explaining that Lennon is scared because of the high price he paid to live his life and that what he gained from paying that price is slipping away. In the second verse Lennon is scarred and has only been able to "manage to survive" and does not want to face his own "hatred and jealousy". In the last verse Lennon sings that he is tired of being alone with no place of his own, but Urish and Bielen interpret this as an expression of "existential angst," of Lennon being "tired of life's battles." Urish and Bielen interpret the "trudging rhythm" of the fadeout as an indication that the battles Lennon sang about will not cease.

"Scared" begins with the sound of a howling wolf before settling into its brooding musical setting. Urish and Bielen feel that the guitar notes that form a counterpoint to the song's melody are based on the opening howling wolf sound. The music includes overdubbed strings and horns. Urish and Bielen criticize the guitar and the horn overdubs for producing a "confusing emotional maelstrom" rather than the pure "exposed pain" that they feel the song would otherwise evoke.

Beatles FAQ author Robert Rodriguez described the song saying that "With a walking rhythm and bent notes that echoed the tone of the lone wolf howl heard at the start, John described the battering life had given him, leaving him frightened, wounded and angry." Rodriguez went on to say that Lennon "sounds as though he has no expectation that the outcome will be good."

Lennon believed that the Rolling Stones' 1978 song "Miss You" was based on "Scared", albeit taken at a faster tempo. He spoke of "Scared", stating that

I was scared when I wrote it, if you can't tell. It was the whole separation from Ono, thinking I lost the one thing I knew I needed. You know, I think Mick Jagger took the song and turned it into "Miss You". When I was in the studio, the engineer said: "This is a hit song if you just do it faster." He was right because "Miss You" is a fast version of my song. I like Mick's record better. I have no ill feelings about it. It could have been subconscious on Mick's part, or conscious. Music is everybody's possession. It's only music publishers who think that people own it.

== Reception ==
Rolling Stone critic Ben Gerson said that "Scared" "throbs with the primal fear and sense of confinement of his earlier solo LPs." Rogan stated that "Scared" is "another powerful statement and proof positive that the pain of [Lennon's] separation from Yoko Ono could work to his artistic advantage." Music critic John Metzger said that Lennon "shows his vulnerability by acknowledging his jealous heart." Ultimate Classic Rock critic Michael Gallucci described the song as a "pained confessional" and regarded it as one of the best songs on Walls and Bridges.

Beatles biographer John Blaney wrote that "Scared" is "as honest and analytical as anything written for [Lennon's 1970 album] John Lennon/Plastic Ono Band." Beatles biographers Chip Madinger and Mark Easter wrote that "'Scared' is a remarkable piece of work. Brilliant singing and a haunting tune on a track which wouldn't have been a sore thumb on either John Lennon/Plastic Ono Band or Imagine."

== Personnel ==
Taken from the liner notes of the digital version of Walls and Bridges

- John Lennon – vocals, piano
- Jim Keltner – drums
- Howard Johnson – baritone saxophone
- The Little Big Horns (Bobby Keys, Frank Vicari, Howard Johnson, Ron Aprea, Steve Madaio) – horns
- Eddie Mottau – acoustic guitar
- Jesse Ed Davis – electric guitar
- Ken Ascher – electric piano
- Arthur Jenkins – percussion
- Nicky Hopkins – piano

== Other versions ==
The version released on Menlove Ave. was a rehearsal take with slightly different lyrics, such as replacing the line "I'm scarred" with "I'm stoned", and has no overdubs. Critic Paul Du Noyer finds this version to be "less assured, and therefore bleaker" than the version on Walls and Bridges.

The version released on John Lennon Anthology also has no overdubs, but is otherwise similar to the Walls and Bridges version.
