= Menlove Ave. =

Compilation album by John Lennon
- Released: 27 October 1986 (US), 5 November 1986 (UK)
- Recorded: Late 1973, July–August 1974, October 1974
- Genre: Rock
- Length: 42:20
- Label: Parlophone/EMI
- Producers: John Lennon, Phil Spector

John Lennon chronology
Live in New York City (1986)	Menlove Ave. (1986)	Imagine: John Lennon (1988)

Professional ratings
Review scores
Source	Rating
AllMusic	3/5 stars
Blender	3/5 stars
Robert Christgau	B+
MusicHound	3.5/5 stars
Q	2/5 stars
The Rolling Stone Album Guide	3/5 stars

Menlove Ave. is a 1986 compilation album by English rock musician John Lennon. It is the second posthumous release of Lennon's music (after Milk and Honey), having been recorded during the sessions for his albums Walls and Bridges and Rock 'n' Roll. Menlove Ave. was released under the supervision of Yoko Ono, Lennon's widow.

== Background ==
The first side of the LP comprises session outtakes from the Rock 'n' Roll sessions with Phil Spector in late 1973, apart from "Rock 'n' Roll People", which is from the Mind Games sessions. The remainder features rehearsal recordings in mid-1974 for Walls and Bridges.

The song "Rock 'n' Roll People" was originally recorded and released on Johnny Winter's seventh studio album John Dawson Winter III.

The title refers to Lennon's childhood home, 251 Menlove Avenue, in Liverpool. Menlove Avenue is a long road in South Liverpool, part of the Liverpool ring road. While it is mainly residential, it is also a primary route: the A562. It also passes Woolton Village where Lennon and Paul McCartney first met.

Yoko Ono's liner notes mention that "John's American rock roots – Elvis Presley, Fats Domino and Phil Spector – are evident in these tracks. But what I hear in John's voice are the other roots of the boy who grew up in Liverpool, listening to 'Greensleeves,' BBC Radio and Tessie O'Shea".

=== Album cover ===
The artwork for the release was effected by artist Andy Warhol, just months before Lennon's death in 1980. It was later used as the cover for the 2005 compilation album Working Class Hero: The Definitive Lennon.

== Reception and aftermath ==
Though Menlove Ave. included previously unreleased material of John Lennon, it failed to chart in the United Kingdom. It did manage to reach number 127 in the United States, making it Lennon's least-successful album. Menlove Ave. was issued on CD in 1987, and remains available from Capitol Records in that format.

Side 1, tracks 3–5 appeared as bonus tracks on the 2004 remastered version of Rock 'n' Roll. The song "Here We Go Again" was included on the 2006 soundtrack album The U.S. vs. John Lennon and 2010 box set Gimme Some Truth.

The album is the only one of Lennon's not available on music streaming platforms.

== Track listing ==
Side one
No.	Title	Writer(s)	Length
1.	"Here We Go Again"	John Lennon, Phil Spector	4:50
2.	"Rock 'n' Roll People"	Lennon	4:21
3.	"Angel Baby"	Rosie Hamlin	3:42
4.	"Since My Baby Left Me"	Arthur Crudup	3:48
5.	"To Know Her Is to Love Her"	Spector	4:37

Side two
No.	Title	Writer(s)	Length
1.	"Steel and Glass"	Lennon	4:10
2.	"Scared"	Lennon	4:17
3.	"Old Dirt Road"	Harry Nilsson, Lennon	3:53
4.	"Nobody Loves You (When You're Down and Out)"	Lennon	4:29
5.	"Bless You"	Lennon	4:05

Notes

- Side 1, tracks 1 and 3–5 are outtakes recorded in late 1973 during the Rock 'n' Roll sessions.
- Side 1, track 2 was recorded mid-1973 for, but left off of, Mind Games.
- Side 2, tracks 1–5 are mid-1974 rehearsal recordings for Walls and Bridges.

== Personnel ==
- John Lennon: vocals, guitars, piano (side 2), producer (side 1, track 2; side 2)
- Jesse Ed Davis: guitar (side 2)
- Klaus Voormann: bass (side 2)
- Jim Keltner: drums (side 2)
- Phil Spector: producer (side 1, tracks 1, 3–5)
