= Peace, Love & Truth =

Compilation album by John Lennon and Yoko Ono
- Released: 4 August 2005
- Recorded: 1969–2004
- Genre: Rock
- Length: 68:48
- Label: EMI
- Producer: John Lennon, Yoko Ono and Phil Spector

John Lennon and Yoko Ono chronology
Acoustic (2004)	Peace, Love & Truth (2005)	Working Class Hero: The Definitive Lennon (2005)

Professional ratings
Review scores
Source	Rating
AllMusic	2/5 stars

Peace, Love & Truth is a compilation album of music celebrating John Lennon and Yoko Ono's songs for peace, released only in Asian and Australian markets in August 2005. In place of this release for the rest of the world, Working Class Hero: The Definitive Lennon was issued in October of the same year.

This album has been released with the Copy Control protection system in some regions.

== Track listing ==
All songs by John Lennon, except where noted.

1. "Give Peace a Chance (Remix 2005)" – 6:11 (featuring the Voices of Asia)
2. "Gimme Some Truth" – 3:16
3. "Love" – 3:22
4. "Hold On" – 1:53
5. "Give Peace a Chance Y2K+" – 3:54 (credited solely to Yoko Ono)
6. "Imagine" (John Lennon/Yoko Ono) – 3:04
7. "Bring On the Lucie (Freda Peeple)" – 4:13
8. "Mind Games" – 4:13
9. "Don't Want to Be a Soldier (Remix)" – 6:04
10. "Instant Karma!" – 3:20 (credited to John Lennon and the Plastic Ono Band)
11. "Power to the People" – 3:23
12. "Real Love (Speech Removed)" – 4:08
13. "Help Me to Help Myself" – 2:09
14. "I Don't Wanna Face It" – 3:23
15. "Bless You" – 4:37
16. "Happy Xmas (War Is Over)" (Ono/Lennon) – 3:34 (credited to John & Yoko and the Plastic Ono Band with the Harlem Community Choir)
17. "Listen the Snow Is Falling" (Yoko Ono) – 3:10 (credited to Yoko Ono)
18. "Give Peace a Chance" – 4:54 (credited to the Plastic Ono Band)
