= Bless You (John Lennon song) =

Song by John Lennon

from the album Walls and Bridges
- Released: 26 September 1974
- Recorded: July–August 1974
- Length: 4:38
- Label: Apple
- Songwriter: John Lennon
- Producer: John Lennon

Walls and Bridges track listing
- 12 tracks Side one: 1. "Going Down on Love"; 2. "Whatever Gets You thru the Night"; 3. "Old Dirt Road"; 4. "What You Got"; 5. "Bless You"; 6. "Scared"; Side two: 7. "#9 Dream"; 8. "Surprise, Surprise (Sweet Bird of Paradox)"; 9. "Steel and Glass"; 10. "Beef Jerky"; 11. "Nobody Loves You (When You're Down and Out)"; 12. "Ya Ya"

"Bless You" is a song written by John Lennon that was first released on his 1974 album Walls and Bridges. It is a ballad expressing his love for his wife Yoko Ono, from whom he was separated at the time. Alternative versions appeared on the compilation albums Menlove Ave. and John Lennon Anthology.

== Writing and recording ==
Lennon wrote "Bless You" quickly, more so than other songs on the album. Lennon stated that "As a song, I think it's the best piece of work on the album, although I worked harder on some of the other tracks." On the recording, Lennon sings the vocal part and plays acoustic guitar, Jesse Ed Davis and Eddie Mottau also play guitar, Ken Ascher plays piano and mellotron, Klaus Voormann plays bass guitar, Arthur Jenkins plays percussion and Jim Keltner plays drums. Lennon allowed the other musicians to develop their own parts but insisted that they avoid over-complicating the music. Lennon also noted that the recording engineer felt that the song would be a hit if he speeded it up, and Lennon felt he may have been right in that he thought that the Rolling Stones' hit song "Miss You" was based on speeding up "Bless You."

In 2022, English singer Liam Gallagher released a cover version on an EP for Diamond in the Dark.

== Lyrics and music ==
"Bless You" is a tender ballad that expresses Lennon's love and good wishes for his wife Yoko Ono, from whom he was separated at the time. It differs from earlier songs Lennon had written to and about Ono, in that it does not treat love as a static emotion. According to Lennon,

In a way, it's about Yoko and I. And in a way it's about a lot of couples or all of us who go through that (whatever it's called) love experience, You know, the way love changes, which is one of the surprises of life that we all find out: that it doesn't remain exactly the same all the time, although it's still love. It comes in mysterious forms, its wonders to perform. And "Bless You" expresses one side of it.

"Bless You" also differs from earlier Lennon songs such as "Jealous Guy" and "Run for Your Life" in that he can accept the fact that the object of his affection was away from him and with another man and still express affection for her. Unusual for any love song, the lyrics of the second verse even bless Ono's new lover, asking him to be "warm and kind hearted." The lyrics affirm that the separated couple's relationship can still be restored because their love connection is deeper than outsiders realize, with the lines "Some people say it's over/Now that we have spread our wings/But we know better darling."

Lennon biographer James Patterson describes the music of "Bless You" as having a "relaxed, jazzy-Brazilian beat." Music lecturers Ken Bielen and Ben Urish describe the music of "Bless You" by stating that "a rippling electric piano and gently cascading melody provide a floating effect to the slightly jazzy music." They describe the chord that ends the song as "slightly ominous-sounding," replacing some of the optimism of the lyrics with a sense of unease. They describe Lennon's vocal performance as being "weary and earnest" without being "cloying or overly dramatic," giving the feeling that he has almost given up on reconciliation but still holding on to a little bit of hope. Beatle biographer Bruce Spizer similarly describes Lennon's vocal as being "vulnerable-sounding."

Stereogum contributors Timothy and Elizabeth Bracy felt that the beginning of the song sounds reminiscent of Paul McCartney's "Band on the Run" and speculate that Lennon may have intended to tweak McCartney with it.

== Reception ==
Music journalist Paul de Noyer considers "Bless You" to be as fine a ballad as Lennon ever wrote. Urish and Bielen describe it as "one of Lennon's strongest and most unique love songs." Music critic Johnny Rogan considers it one of Lennon's "most prophetic and convincing love songs" with "one of the most striking melodies on the album." Beatle biographer John Blaney feels that Lennon was able to develop "Bless You" from a "rather maudlin ballad to a shimmering statement of regret that bypassed schmaltz for simple honesty. Goldmine critic Gillian Gaar stated that although it is "beautiful" it is "awash with sadness." Ultimate Classic Rock critic Michael Gallucci regarded it as one of the best songs on Walls and Bridges. Ultimate Classic Rock critic Stephen Lewis rated it as Lennon's 9th greatest solo love song. Stereogum contributors Timothy and Elizabeth Bracy rated it as Lennon's 5th best solo song, calling it a "a warm, languid, light jazz workout punctuated by lounge-y electronic piano runs" and saying that "there is no venom in these lyrics, just feelings of true love and charity, and the knowledge that he and Yoko’s hearts are forever entwined."

Lennon felt that "Bless You" was the best song on Walls and Bridges. May Pang, who was Lennon's lover at the time felt that the song would be received well by Ono, stating that "It's a beautiful song. [Ono's] going to love it."

== Alternate versions ==
Ono included an earlier version of "Bless You" on the 1986 compilation album Menlove Ave.. The Beatles Bible describes this version as being "more rueful" than the Walls and Bridges version. Yet another version was released on the 1998 compilation album John Lennon Anthology. Spizer regards this version as being very similar to the Walls and Bridges version. The main differences are in the bass guitar part.

== Personnel ==
Taken from the liner notes of the Digital version of Walls and Bridges

- John Lennon – vocals
- Jim Keltner – drums
- Klaus Voormann – bass
- Ken Ascher – electric piano, mellotron
- Jesse Ed Davis – guitar
- Arthur Jenkins – percussion
- Eddie Mottau, Rev. Fred Ghurkin – acoustic guitars
