= Walls and Bridges =

Studio album by John Lennon
- Released: 26 September 1974
- Recorded: June–August 1974
- Studios: Record Plant East, New York City
- Genres: Rock, pop rock
- Length: 46:02
- Label: Apple
- Producer: John Lennon

John Lennon chronology
Mind Games (1973)	Walls and Bridges (1974)	Rock 'n' Roll (1975)

Singles from Walls and Bridges
- 1. "Whatever Gets You thru the Night" Released: 23 September 1974; 2. "#9 Dream" Released: 16 December 1974

Walls and Bridges is the fourth solo studio album by the English musician John Lennon. It was issued by Apple Records on 26 September 1974 in the United States and on 4 October in the United Kingdom. Written, recorded and released during his 18-month separation from Yoko Ono, the album captured Lennon in the midst of his "Lost Weekend". Walls and Bridges was an American number-one album on both the Billboard and Record World charts and included two hit singles, "Whatever Gets You thru the Night" and "#9 Dream". The first of these was Lennon's first number-one hit in the United States as a solo artist, and his only solo chart-topping single in either the US or Britain during his lifetime.

The album was certified silver in the UK, and gold in the US. It was Lennon's last album of self-penned material released solely under his own name during his lifetime.

== Background ==
In June 1973, as Lennon was about to record Mind Games, Ono suggested that she and Lennon should separate. Lennon soon moved to California with his and Ono's personal assistant May Pang with Ono's encouragement and they embarked on an 18-month relationship he would later refer to as his "Lost Weekend". While he and Pang were living in Los Angeles, Lennon took the opportunity to get reacquainted with his son Julian, whom he had not seen in two years.

Lennon had planned to begin recording Rock 'n' Roll with producer Phil Spector, but these sessions became legendary not for the music produced but for alcohol-fuelled antics. Lennon and Pang returned to New York and Spector disappeared with these session tapes. Around this time, Lennon had written several new songs during a stay at The Pierre and started recording a few home demos.

== Recording ==
Lennon began rehearsing his new material with studio musicians at Record Plant East in New York City in June 1974 which included Jim Keltner on drums, Klaus Voormann on bass guitar, Jesse Ed Davis on guitar and Arthur Jenkins on percussion. The core players were billed on the album as the Plastic Ono Nuclear Band, a variation on Plastic Ono Band, the conceptual group to which many of Lennon's solo efforts were credited.

The musicians worked out their own arrangements in a short time, and the recording advanced quickly. Ron Aprea, the saxophonist from the Little Big Horns, said that "Since he had no formal training in arranging, he would sit in the control room and let us make up our own parts. If he liked what we played, he would let us know ... If we thought we could get it better, he would say 'go for it'." Aprea also said that the brass section was recorded over a two-week period. Lennon later said that it had been "an extraordinary year for me personally. And I'm almost amazed that I could get anything out. But I enjoyed doing Walls and Bridges and it wasn't hard when I had the whole thing to go into the studio and do it. I'm surprised it wasn't just all bluuuuuuggggghhhhh." Rehearsals were released on the posthumous albums Menlove Ave. and John Lennon Anthology.

Engineer Jimmy Iovine said that the sessions were "the most professional I have still been on ... John knew what he wanted, he knew how to get what he was going for, he was going after a noise and he knew how to get it ... His solo thing had an incredible sound to it. And he really had his own sound." Despite Record Plant being one of the most state-of-the-art recording studios in New York at that point, Lennon's vocal overdubs were done with an old stage microphone, which had been left in a bass drum for years. Iovine said that "(it) was an old beat up one ... so it was dull in a way, but John's voice was so bright, that it sounded incredible on it. It turned out to be great vocal sound, like on '#9 Dream'."

== Music and lyrics ==
Walls and Bridges has a variety of musical stylings and many of the lyrics make it clear that Lennon both enjoyed his new-found freedom and also missed Ono. The album title refers to the barriers that Lennon had constructed between himself and others and his hope that those barriers could be surmounted. Lennon said, "Walls keep you in either protectively or otherwise, and bridges get you somewhere else."

"Going Down on Love", the album's opening track, incorporates a sexual pun and the lyrics reflect Lennon's feelings about his separation from Ono. The second track, "Whatever Gets You thru the Night" was issued as the album's first single. The inspiration for the lyrics came from late-night television. In December 2005, May Pang told Radio Times: "At night he loved to channel-surf, and would pick up phrases from all the shows. One time, he was watching Reverend Ike, a famous black evangelist, who was saying, "Let me tell you guys, it doesn't matter, it's whatever gets you through the night." John loved it and said, "I've got to write it down or I'll forget it." He always kept a pad and pen by the bed. That was the beginning of 'Whatever Gets You Thru the Night'." The music was inspired by the number one single at the time, "Rock Your Baby" by George McCrae. Although the released track bears little resemblance, the inspiration is more apparent on the alternative version released on John Lennon Anthology. The third track is the Lennon/Harry Nilsson composition "Old Dirt Road" which features Nilsson on harmony vocal.

The next two tracks, "What You Got" and "Bless You", are again songs addressing his feelings about his separation from Ono. Lennon later called the jazzy "Bless You" the "best piece of work on the album ... that seems to be the best track, to me." Side one closes with "Scared", a haunting track which explores Lennon's fear of ageing, loneliness and the emptiness of success.

Side two leads off with the album's second single, "#9 Dream", which features May Pang on background vocals. According to Pang, two working titles for the song were "So Long Ago" and "Walls & Bridges". The song was notable as a favourite of Lennon's, despite his later claim that the song was a "throwaway". Pang recalled, "This was one of John's favorite songs, because it literally came to him in a dream. He woke up and wrote down those words along with the melody. He had no idea what [Ah, Bowakawa pousse] meant, but he thought it sounded beautiful." The next track is a song Lennon wrote for Pang, "Surprise, Surprise (Sweet Bird of Paradox)" which features Elton John on harmony vocal. "Steel and Glass" includes a sinister riff reminiscent of "How Do You Sleep?", Lennon's audio argument with Paul McCartney from the Imagine album, although the digs this time were thought to be directed at the former Beatles manager Allen Klein. (Note: Despite Lennon's animosity towards Klein, he was staying at Klein's home when he wrote the song. Whenever Lennon was asked if the song was about Klein, Lennon denied it.) "Beef Jerky", a rare Lennon instrumental, is a funky, R&B-inspired track. In a nod to his old partner, it also contains a riff that replicates one from Paul McCartney's "Let Me Roll It", which was a song McCartney wrote in a "Lennon style."

The penultimate track, "Nobody Loves You (When You're Down and Out)", was written in 1973 when he and Pang first arrived in Los Angeles. He envisioned Frank Sinatra recording it, saying, "I don't know why. It's kind of a Sinatraesque song, really. He would do a perfect job with it. Are you listening Frank? You need one song that isn't a piece of nothing. Here's one for you, the horn arrangement and everything's made for you. But don't ask me to produce it!"

The final track is a cover version of Lee Dorsey's "Ya Ya", with Lennon (billed as "Dad") on piano and vocals and son Julian on drums. Lennon surprised Julian with its inclusion on the album, prompting the young Lennon to remark, "If I'd known it was going on the album, I would have played better!"

When discussing the recording of the album, in an interview the following year with Pete Hamill in Rolling Stone, Lennon recalled, "Elton sort of popped in on the sessions for Walls and Bridges and sort of zapped in and played the piano and ended up singing 'Whatever Gets You Thru the Night' with me. Which was a great shot in the arm. I'd done three quarters of it, 'Now what do we do?' Should we put a camel on it or a xylophone? That sort of thing. And he came in and said, 'Hey, I'll play some piano!'"

== Album artwork ==
Originally, Lennon planned to use some of his childhood drawings for the cover of an oldies album he had begun in 1973, but when he put that on hold to record Walls and Bridges, he decided to use the artwork already in production. The album's elaborate outer jacket featured some of his drawings, including one portraying a game of football, specifically the goal scored by George Robledo in the 1952 FA Cup Final. That drawing also featured Newcastle United's number 9 Jackie Milburn; Lennon lived as a child at 9 Newcastle Road and had a lifelong fascination with the number. There is also a series of photos of Lennon's face with different expressions. The front cover contained two flaps which, when folded, created several interchangeable "Lennon faces", some of them silly.

The album's art direction was credited to Capitol's in-house designer, Roy Kohara. The booklet inside the LP included a front photo of Lennon with no glasses and a back photo of Lennon with five pairs of glasses piled on top of one another, both by the American photographer Bob Gruen. The inner sleeve contained another portrait as well as a horizontal melange of the other photos.

Inside the booklet were lyrics and instrumental credits for the songs, which conveyed Lennon's trademark sense of humour, with many aliases for himself including Rev. Thumbs Ghurkin, Kaptain Kundalini, Dwarf McDougal, Mel Torment (a pun on Mel Tormé), Hon. John St. John Johnson, Dr. Dream, Dr. Winston O'Boogie and Dad. More 1952 colour drawings from the 11-year-old Lennon were included, with subjects including the American Old West (dedicated to his aunt and guardian, Mimi Smith), landscapes and a portrait of his schoolteacher, Mr. Bolt. (Note: In 2005, an art exhibition was held at 251 Menlove Avenue in Liverpool that showcased these and other early efforts.) Also included was a genealogical treatise on the surname Lennon and related forms from one of Edward MacLysaght's books. While mentioning the British sailor John Lennon and the American labour leader John Brown Lennon of many decades past, the entry ends with a slight about the surname family generally being undistinguished, to which Lennon offered a hand-written "Oh Yeh?". Finally, the booklet contains a claim that Lennon saw an unidentified flying object on the evening of 23 August 1974.

== Release and promotion ==
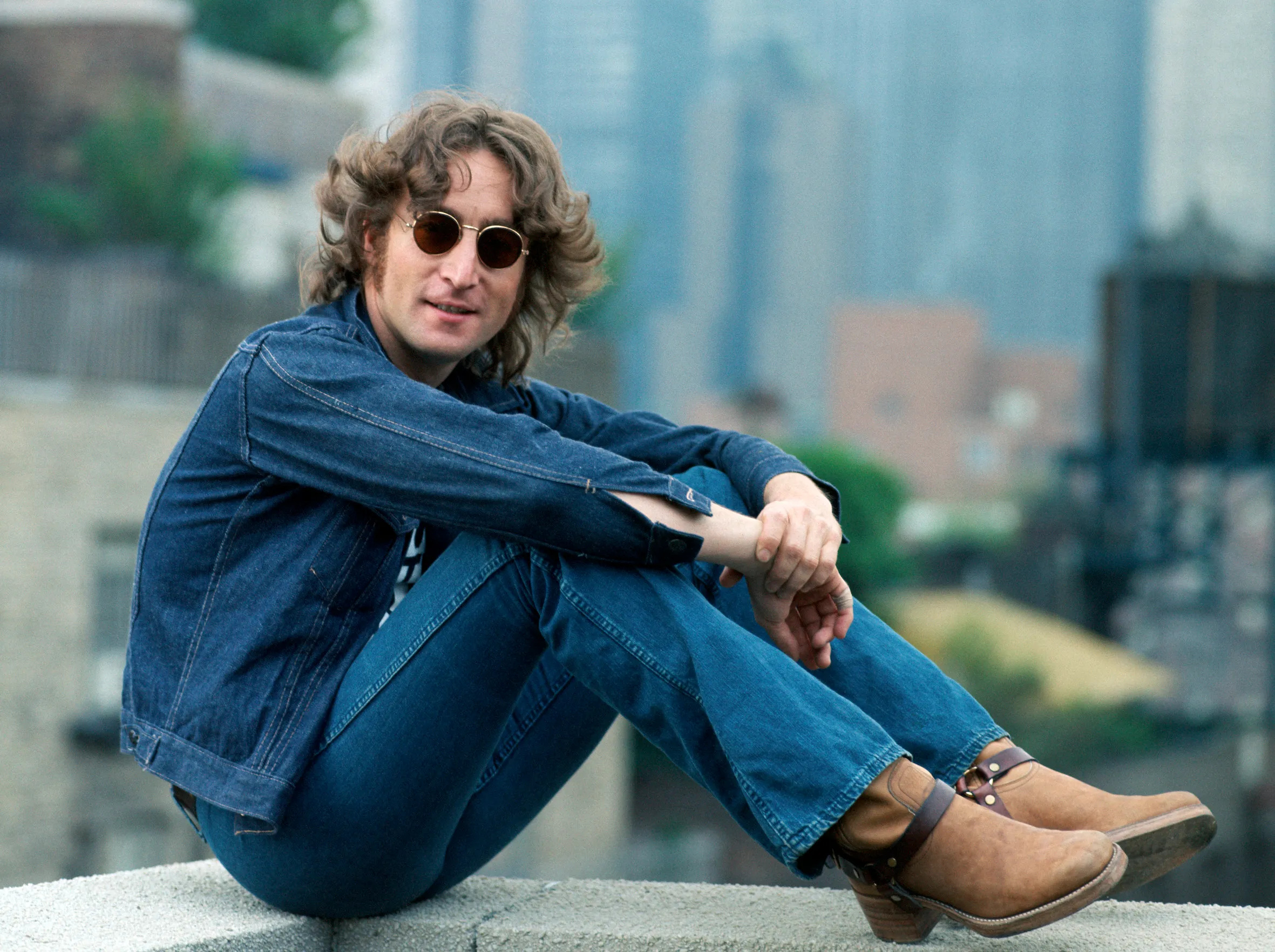
Lennon in a promotional photo for Walls and Bridges, 1974.

Unsure of which track should be the album's lead single, Lennon enlisted the help of Al Coury, the vice-president of marketing for Capitol Records. Lennon had been impressed with the "magic" that Coury displayed in the commercial success of McCartney's Band on the Run album. Coury chose "Whatever Gets You thru the Night" as the first single. Walls and Bridges was released on 26 September 1974 in the US, and on 4 October 1974 in the UK. (Note: The Apple catalogue numbers in those markets were SW 3416 and PCTC 253, respectively.) The release was accompanied by an advertising campaign, created by Lennon, called "Listen To This ..." (button, photo, sticker, ad, poster or T-shirt). The backs of 500 New York City buses were plastered with the slogan "Listen To This Bus". Television commercials depicted the LP jacket with its many "Lennon" faces; as with the radio segments promoting the album, these commercials had a voiceover from Ringo Starr. Lennon returned the favour by supplying the voiceover in commercials for Starr's Goodnight Vienna album, which he had also helped record. In the UK, EMI released an interview single to promote Walls and Bridges, (Note: UK Apple PSR 369) with Lennon in conversation with Bob Mercer.

In the U.S., the album debuted on the Billboard Top LPs & Tape chart on 12 October and reached the top ten on 2 November. It was awarded gold record status on 22 October in the US by the Recording Industry Association of America. The album and the single topped Billboard's listings during the same week (16 November). Both releases also topped the US charts compiled by Cash Box and Record World. In the UK, the album reached number 6, and the single peaked at number 36. Walls and Bridges spent a total of 27 weeks on Billboard's Top LPs & Tape chart.

"Whatever Gets You thru the Night" was Lennon's first number 1 single on the Billboard Hot 100 as a solo artist. This achievement, together with the US success of the album, marked a comeback for Lennon, whose career since Imagine in 1971 had trailed that of his former Beatles bandmates in terms of commercial success. When asked for his opinion of Walls and Bridges during the press conference for his 1974 North American tour, George Harrison described it as a "lovely" album. Ringo Starr said he admired all of Lennon's work, apart from Some Time in New York City, and he lauded Walls and Bridges as "the finest album in the last five years by anybody". McCartney said it was a "great" record but added: "I know he can do better." McCartney cited the Beatles' "I Am the Walrus" as an example of how Lennon could be "more adventurous … more exciting".

Shortly after its release, Lennon personally mixed a four channel quadraphonic version of Walls and Bridges ("for the 20 people who buy quad", he joked in his 1974 WNEW-FM radio interview in New York). The quadraphonic mix was issued only on 8-track tape in the US. (Note: US Apple Q8W-3416) "#9 Dream", backed with "What You Got", was released as a single in the US on 16 December 1974, and a month later in the UK, on 24 January 1975. The single peaked at number 9 on the Billboard Hot 100 and number 23 in the UK.

During the recording of "Whatever Gets You thru the Night", Elton John had bet Lennon that the song would top the charts. Never believing it would, Lennon agreed to perform live with John if it did. Having lost the wager, Lennon appeared at John's Madison Square Garden show on 28 November, performing "Whatever Gets You thru the Night" together with the Beatles' "I Saw Her Standing There" and "Lucy in the Sky with Diamonds". All three tracks were later released on an EP, 28th November 1974, in 1981. Lennon returned to the stage to play tambourine on the encore, John's "The Bitch Is Back". The Madison Square Garden show would be Lennon's last major live performance.

== Critical reception ==
=== Contemporary reviews ===
Professional ratings
Review scores
Source	Rating
AllMusic	3.5/5 stars
All-Music Guide to Rock	4/5 stars
Christgau's Record Guide	B−
Mojo	4/5 stars
The Music Box	4/5 stars
MusicHound	2.5/5
Paste	3/5 stars
The Rolling Stone Album Guide	3/5 stars
Uncut	4/5 stars
Uncut (2010)	2/5 stars

Walls and Bridges received a mixed response from contemporary music critics, although it still garnered Lennon his most favourable reviews since Imagine. Ben Gerson of Rolling Stone magazine said he felt that songs on side two such as "#9 Dream" and "Surprise Surprise" make the album "diverse and spirited", but that side one's songs about Lennon's emotional loss were inconsistent. Gerson also said that only "Scared" "throbs with the primal fear and sense of confinement of his earlier solo LPs". Robert Christgau, writing for The Village Voice, felt the album suffered from Lennon's "disorientation and lost conviction". In his review for Melody Maker, Ray Coleman described Lennon as "the most interesting ex-Beatle" and concluded of Walls and Bridges: "This is a truly superb album by any standards, words and music a joy to hear, by a musician who has a rare talent for selling love without making you cringe." In another positive review, Billboard found the album's production "superb", its ballads "marvelously handled", and all songs "done in a skillfully professional style". The magazine cited it as possibly Lennon's "most versatile and musically excellent album yet".

Writing for the NME, Charles Shaar Murray described the musicianship as "faultless, if a trifle pedestrian" and the production "as smooth and silky as any discerning hi-fi buff could want", but considered the songs to be "mostly a drag, and worse, most of them are solidly rooted in the Lennonlore of old". While deriding "Nobody Loves You When You're Down and Out" as "the rankest and most offensive piece of self-pity that Lennon has yet indulged in", Shaar Murray concluded of the album: "None of this mediocre waste is worthy of the man who wrote 'Working Class Hero' and 'I Found Out'." In another unfavourable review, for Creem, Wayne Robins described Walls and Bridges as "the latest chapter in John Lennon's Identity Crisis" and a work made up of "weary cliches". Of the two tracks that he deemed "good", Robins added: "'Old Dirt Road' shows the brilliant instinct for phrasing and rhythm of language that a guy named John Lennon used to have before he started hiding behind walls of aliases like Dr. Winston O'Boogie, and sleeping under bridges played by that Plastic Ono Sominex Band. ZZzzzzz."

In their 1975 book The Beatles: An Illustrated Record, the NME journalists Roy Carr and Tony Tyler characterised the album as "generally lacklustre", saying that the lyrics "seem mechanical, cranked-out, like well-worn conversational gambits", while praising the "abrasive" quality of his voice and the "excellent" musicianship. In his Rolling Stone feature on Lennon that same year, Pete Hamill wrote that the album's music was "wonderful" and that "the songs were essays in autobiography, the words and music of a man trying to understand a huge part of his life." In his 1977 book The Beatles Forever, Nicholas Schaffner said that the album's "searing emotional intensity" recalled Lennon's 1970 John Lennon/Plastic Ono Band, while the "richly textured arrangements and melodic diversity" harkened back to Imagine. In the first edition of The Rolling Stone Record Guide (1979), Greil Marcus gave the album two stars out of five, saying that it, along with Mind Games, lacked a real point of view and that "with what appeared to be panic, [Lennon had] substituted production techniques for soul, building a bridge to his listeners with his sound but erecting a wall around himself with empty music."

=== Legacy ===
Writing in The All-Music Guide to Rock (1995), William Ruhlmann described Walls and Bridges as "craftsmanlike pop-rock" with "some lovely album tracks". Uncut gave it four stars and asserted that "Whatever Gets You Through the Night" "remains one of Lennon's best post-Beatles achievements". AllMusic senior editor Stephen Thomas Erlewine finds the album "decidedly uneven", "containing equal amounts of brilliance and nonsense", with the lesser tracks "weighed down by weak melodies and heavy over-production". In The New Rolling Stone Album Guide of 2004, "#9 Dream" was singled out for praise as "a heavily atmospheric number boasting cool cellos and fine singing". Lennon biographer Philip Norman wrote in 2008 that "Most of the tracks had an upbeat, brassy feel, strangely at odds with John's recurrent, often desperate admissions of longing for Yoko", and that the chord sequences used often echoed those from his previous work with Ono. In 2022, Listverse described Lennon's process as necessary, before proclaiming it the "last of the essential" Lennon albums.

== Aftermath and reissues ==
Walls and Bridges was the last album to feature original songs by Lennon until 1980's Double Fantasy, although a follow-up to Walls and Bridges, to be titled Between the Lines, was planned for late 1975. Tony King, an Apple vice-president, confirms this. King also says that Carlos Alomar was to hire a group of black musicians, and that Lennon had written the song "Tennessee" for the album. In a 1975 interview for the Old Grey Whistle Test, Lennon indicated he was planning a new album and a TV special.

Walls and Bridges was first re-released on vinyl in the US in 1978, then again in 1982, and 1989, on Capitol. After Lennon's death, the album, along with seven other Lennon albums, was reissued by EMI as part of a box set, which was released in the UK on 15 June 1981. (Note: UK EMI JLB8) It was re-released on vinyl in the UK in 1985, on the Parlophone label. (Note: UK Parlophone ATAK 43) Walls and Bridges was first released on CD on 20 July 1987 in the UK, (Note: UK EMI CDP 7 467 68 2) and nearly a year later in the US, on 19 April 1988. (Note: US EMI CDP 7 46768 2) The album was released again on vinyl, this time as part of EMI's limited edition "The Millennium Vinyl Collection" series, in 1999. (Note: Europe Apple MILL 99/4994641)

Walls and Bridges was released in a remixed and remastered form in November 2005 (Note: Europe Apple/Parlophone 0946 3 40971 2 3/340 9712) (Note: US Capitol CDP 0946 3 40971 2 3) (although four of the original tracks – "Old Dirt Road", "Bless You", "Scared" and "Nobody Loves You" – were not remixed). The remastered version featured an alternative cover. This new cover retained Lennon's signature and hand-written title, but used one of the portraits Bob Gruen took for the album instead of Lennon's childhood drawings. The bonus tracks for the reissue include "Whatever Gets You thru The Night" performed live with Elton John, a previously unreleased acoustic version of "Nobody Loves You (When You're Down And Out)", and a promotional interview with Lennon.

Capitol again reissued the album on 4 October 2010. This version was a remaster of the original album mixes and used the original cover art; the album was available separately (Note: US Capitol 5099990650321) or as part of the John Lennon Signature Box. (Note: Europe EMI 5099990650925)

== Track listing ==
All tracks are written by John Lennon, except where noted.

Side one
No.	Title	Writer(s)	Length
1.	"Going Down on Love"		3:54
2.	"Whatever Gets You thru the Night"		3:28
3.	"Old Dirt Road"	Lennon, Harry Nilsson	4:11
4.	"What You Got"		3:09
5.	"Bless You"		4:38
6.	"Scared"		4:36

Side two
No.	Title	Writer(s)	Length
7.	"#9 Dream"		4:47
8.	"Surprise, Surprise (Sweet Bird of Paradox)"		2:55
9.	"Steel and Glass"		4:37
10.	"Beef Jerky"		3:26
11.	"Nobody Loves You (When You're Down and Out)"		5:08
12.	"Ya Ya"	Lee Dorsey, Clarence Lewis, Morgan Robinson, Morris Levy	1:06
Total length:			46:02

2005 reissue bonus tracks
No.	Title	Length
13.	"Whatever Gets You thru the Night" (Live with the Elton John band)	4:23
14.	"Nobody Loves You (When You're Down and Out)" (Alternative version)	5:07
15.	"John Interview" (by Bob Mercer)	3:47
Total length:		59:19

== Personnel ==
Credits are adapted from the album booklet.

- John Lennon – arrangements, lead, harmony and backing vocals, rhythm guitar, acoustic guitar, lead guitar, piano, whistling, percussion, production
- Ken Ascher – piano, Fender Rhodes, clavinet, mellotron
- Jim Keltner – drums
- Arthur Jenkins – percussion
- Nicky Hopkins – piano
- Klaus Voormann – bass guitar
- Bobby Keys – tenor saxophone
- Jesse Ed Davis – lead guitar, acoustic guitar
- Eddie Mottau – acoustic guitar
- Strings and brass musicians from The Philharmonic Orchestrange – arranged and conducted by Ken Ascher
- Little Big Horns – Ron Aprea (alto saxophone), Bobby Keys (tenor saxophone), Frank Vicari (tenor saxophone), Howard Johnson (baritone saxophone), Steve Madaio (trumpet)
- Julian Lennon – drums on "Ya Ya"
- Elton John – piano and harmony vocals on "Whatever Gets You thru the Night", Hammond organ and background vocals on "Surprise, Surprise (Sweet Bird of Paradox)"
- Harry Nilsson – backing vocals on "Old Dirt Road"
- The 44th Street Fairies: Joey Dambra, Lori Burton and May Pang – background vocals on "#9 Dream"

Technical

- Shelly Yakus – engineer
- Jimmy Iovine – overdub engineer
- Roy Cicala – remix engineer
- May Pang – production coordinator
- Roy Kohara – art direction
- Bob Gruen – photography

== Charts ==
=== Weekly charts ===
Chart (1974–75)	Position
Australian Kent Music Report	4
Canadian RPM Albums Chart	1
Danish Albums Chart	7
Dutch Mega Albums Chart	16
Finnish Albums Chart	13
Italian LP Chart	11
Japanese Oricon LP Chart	14
Norwegian VG-lista Albums Chart	3
Swedish Albums Chart	6
UK Albums Chart	6
US Billboard 200	1
West German Media Control Albums Chart	41

=== Year-end charts ===
Chart (1974)	Position
Australian Albums Chart	26
Canadian Albums Chart	17
Chart (1975)	Position
Canadian Albums Chart	44
US Billboard Year-End	84

== Certifications ==
Region	Certification	Certified units/sales
United Kingdom (BPI)	Silver	60,000^{^}
United States (RIAA)	Gold	500,000^{^}
^{^} Shipments figures based on certification alone.
