= John Lennon Anthology =

1998 box set by John Lennon

Box set by John Lennon
- Released: 2 November 1998
- Recorded: June 1969 – November 1980
- Genre: Rock
- Length: 267:51
- Label: Capitol/EMI
- Producers: Yoko Ono and Rob Stevens
- Compiler: Yoko Ono

John Lennon chronology
Lennon Legend: The Very Best of John Lennon (1997)	John Lennon Anthology (1998)	Instant Karma: All-Time Greatest Hits (2002)

Professional ratings
Review scores
Source	Rating
AllMusic	3.5/5 stars
Paste	4/5 stars
The Rolling Stone Album Guide	3/5 stars
Wall of Sound	72/100

John Lennon Anthology is a four-CD box set of home demos, studio outtakes and other previously unreleased material recorded by John Lennon over the course of his solo career from "Give Peace a Chance" in 1969 up until the 1980 sessions for Double Fantasy and Milk and Honey.

The anthology was divided by its compiler and co-producer, Yoko Ono, into four discs representing four eras in Lennon's solo career: "Ascot", "New York City", "The Lost Weekend" and "Dakota".

John Lennon Anthology reached number 62 in the United Kingdom and number 99 in the United States, where it went gold.

A one-disc distillation of the highlights of the box set was released as Wonsaponatime. Many of the tracks were edited down from their versions on John Lennon Anthology. Wonsaponatime failed to reach the US charts but peaked at number 76 in the UK.

== Track listing ==
All songs were written by John Lennon, except where noted.

Disc 1 (Ascot)
No.	Title	Recording source	Length
1.	"Working Class Hero"	John Lennon/Plastic Ono Band sessions (1970)	4:19
2.	"God"	John Lennon/Plastic Ono Band sessions (1970)	3:32
3.	"I Found Out"	Home recording (1970)	3:47
4.	"Hold On"	John Lennon/Plastic Ono Band sessions (1970)	0:43
5.	"Isolation"	John Lennon/Plastic Ono Band sessions (1970)	3:46
6.	"Love (Alternate version)"	John Lennon/Plastic Ono Band sessions (1970)	2:43
7.	"Mother (Early take)"	John Lennon/Plastic Ono Band sessions (1970)	3:49
8.	"Remember (Rehearsal)"	John Lennon/Plastic Ono Band sessions (1970)	2:44
9.	"Imagine (take 1)"	Imagine sessions (1971)	3:21
10.	"'Fortunately'"	Excerpt from 24 Hours: The World of John and Yoko	0:19
11.	"Baby Please Don't Go" (Walter Ward)	Imagine sessions (1971)	4:04
12.	"Oh My Love" (Lennon/Ono)	Imagine sessions (1971)	2:53
13.	"Jealous Guy"	Imagine sessions (1971)	4:10
14.	"Maggie Mae" (Trad. Arr. John Lennon/Paul McCartney/George Harrison/Richard Starkey)	Home recording (1979)	0:52
15.	"How Do You Sleep?"	Imagine sessions (1971)	5:20
16.	"God Save Oz (with Bill Elliott and the Elastic Oz Band)" (Lennon/Ono)	Non-album single (1971)	3:27
17.	"Do the Oz" (Lennon/Ono)	B-side of "God Save Oz" (1971)	3:08
18.	"I Don't Want to Be a Soldier (Take 2)"	Imagine sessions (1971)	5:20
19.	"Give Peace a Chance"	4-track rehearsal tapes prior to master recording (1969)	1:52
20.	"Look at Me (Alternate version)"	John Lennon/Plastic Ono Band sessions (1970)	2:50
21.	"Long Lost John" (Trad Arr. John Lennon)	John Lennon/Plastic Ono Band sessions (1970)	2:14

Disc 2 (New York City)
No.	Title	Recording source	Length
1.	"New York City"	Home recording (1971)	0:55
2.	"Attica State (Live)" (Lennon/Ono)	The Apollo live performance (1971)	4:25
3.	"Imagine (Live)"	The Apollo live performance (1971)	3:11
4.	"Bring on the Lucie (Freeda Peeple) (Alternate version)"	Mind Games sessions (1973)	4:07
5.	"Woman Is the Nigger of the World" (Lennon/Ono)	Home recording (1971)	0:39
6.	"Geraldo Rivera – One to One Concert"	Live in New York City	0:39
7.	"Woman Is the Nigger of the World (Live)" (Lennon/Ono)	Live in New York City	5:14
8.	"It's So Hard (Live)"	Live in New York City	3:09
9.	"Come Together (Live)" (John Lennon/Paul McCartney)	Live in New York City	4:19
10.	"Happy Xmas" (Ono/Lennon)	Non-album single (1971)	3:32
11.	"The Luck of the Irish (Live)" (Lennon/Ono)	John Sinclair Freedom Rally	3:42
12.	"John Sinclair (Live)"	John Sinclair Freedom Rally	3:43
13.	"The David Frost Show"	TV audio (1971)	0:52
14.	"Mind Games (I Promise)"	Home recording (1970)	1:01
15.	"Mind Games (Make Love, Not War)"	Home recording (1970)	1:14
16.	"One Day (At a Time)"	Mind Games sessions (1973)	3:13
17.	"I Know (I Know)"	Home recording (1973)	3:13
18.	"I'm the Greatest (Guide vocal)"	Demo, given to Ringo Starr (1973)	3:37
19.	"Goodnight Vienna"	Demo, given to Ringo Starr (1974)	2:42
20.	"Jerry Lewis Telethon"	TV audio (1972)	1:59
21.	"A Kiss Is Just a Kiss" (Herman Hupfeld)	Home vignette (1976)	0:11
22.	"Real Love"	Piano demo (1979)	4:13
23.	"You Are Here"	Mind Games sessions (1973)	4:55

Disc 3 (The Lost Weekend)
No.	Title	Recording source	Length
1.	"What You Got"	Home recording (1974)	1:14
2.	"Nobody Loves You (When You're Down and Out) (Alternate version)"	Walls and Bridges sessions (1974)	5:38
3.	"Whatever Gets You thru the Night"	Home recording (1974)	0:38
4.	"Whatever Gets You thru the Night"	Walls and Bridges sessions (1974)	3:33
5.	"Yesterday (parody)" (John Lennon/Paul McCartney)	Walls and Bridges sessions (1974)	0:33
6.	"Be-Bop-A-Lula" (Gene Vincent/Tex Davis)	Rock 'n' Roll NYC sessions (1974)	2:52
7.	"Rip It Up/Ready Teddy" (Robert Blackwell/John Marascalco)	Rock 'n' Roll NYC sessions (1974)	2:32
8.	"Scared (Without overdubs)"	Walls and Bridges sessions (1974)	5:02
9.	"Steel and Glass (Take 8)"	Walls and Bridges sessions (1974)	4:46
10.	"Surprise, Surprise (Sweet Bird of Paradox) (Early version)"	Walls and Bridges sessions (1974)	2:58
11.	"Bless You (Alternate version)"	Walls and Bridges sessions (1974)	4:15
12.	"Going Down on Love (Instructions only)"	Walls and Bridges sessions (1974)	0:54
13.	"Move Over Ms. L (Alternate version)"	Walls and Bridges sessions (1974)	3:10
14.	"Ain't She Sweet" (Yellen/Ager)	Walls and Bridges sessions (1974)	0:28
15.	"Slippin' and Slidin'" (Richard Penniman/Bocage/Collins/Smith)	Rock 'n' Roll NYC sessions (1974)	2:28
16.	"Peggy Sue" (Jerry Allison/Buddy Holly/Norman Petty)	Rock 'n' Roll NYC sessions (1974)	1:18
17.	"Bring It On Home to Me/Send Me Some Lovin'" (Sam Cooke)/(John Marascalco, Leo Price)	Rock 'n' Roll NYC sessions (1974)	3:50
18.	"Phil and John 1"	Rock 'n' Roll LA sessions (1973)	2:13
19.	"Phil and John 2"	Rock 'n' Roll LA sessions (1973)	2:00
20.	"Phil and John 3"	Rock 'n' Roll LA sessions (1973)	0:54
21.	"When in Doubt, Fuck It"	Rock 'n' Roll LA sessions (1973)	0:09
22.	"Be My Baby" (Phil Spector/Ellie Greenwich/Jeff Barry)	Rock 'n' Roll LA sessions (1973)	4:32
23.	"Stranger's Room"	Home recording (1980)	3:17
24.	"Old Dirt Road (Alternate version)" (John Lennon/Harry Nilsson)	Walls and Bridges sessions (1974)	3:54

Disc 4 (Dakota)
No.	Title	Recording source	Length
1.	"I'm Losing You (Alternate, with Cheap Trick)"	Double Fantasy/Milk and Honey sessions (1980)	4:06
2.	"Sean's 'Little Help'"	Home recording (1979)	0:57
3.	"Serve Yourself"	Home recording (1980)	3:47
4.	"My Life"	Home recording (1980)	2:36
5.	"Nobody Told Me"	Double Fantasy/Milk and Honey sessions (1980)	3:31
6.	"Life Begins at 40"	Home recording (1980), intended for Ringo Starr.	2:23
7.	"I Don't Wanna Face It"	Double Fantasy/Milk and Honey sessions (1980)	3:31
8.	"Woman"	Home recording (1980)	4:01
9.	"Dear Yoko"	Double Fantasy/Milk and Honey sessions (1980)	2:33
10.	"Watching the Wheels"	Home recording (1980)	3:04
11.	"I'm Stepping Out"	Double Fantasy/Milk and Honey sessions (1980)	4:19
12.	"Borrowed Time"	Home recording (1980)	3:57
13.	"The Rishi Kesh Song"	Home recording (1980)	2:26
14.	"Sean's 'Loud'"	Home recording (1979)	0:33
15.	"Beautiful Boy"	Double Fantasy/Milk and Honey sessions (1980)	4:11
16.	"Mr. Hyde's Gone (Don't Be Afraid)"	Home recording (1980)	2:41
17.	"Only You" (Ande Rand/Buck Ram)	Work-tape from Ringo Starr Goodnight Vienna sessions (1974)	3:24
18.	"Grow Old with Me (with new orchestration by George Martin)"	Milk and Honey	3:18
19.	"Dear John"	Home recording (1980)	2:13
20.	"The Great Wok"	Home recording (1979)	3:13
21.	"Mucho Mungo"	Home recording (1976)	1:24
22.	"Satire 1"	Home recording (1979)	2:20
23.	"Satire 2"	Home recording (1979)	4:34
24.	"Satire 3"	Home recording (1979)	0:45
25.	"Sean's "In the Sky""	Home recording (1979)	1:22
26.	"It's Real"	Home recording (1979)	1:05

=== Wonsaponatime ===
Wonsaponatime

Compilation album by John Lennon
- Released: 2 November 1998
- Recorded: September 1970 – late 1980
- Genre: Rock
- Length: 69:45
- Label: Capitol/EMI
- Producers: Yoko Ono, Rob Stevens

John Lennon chronology
Lennon Legend: The Very Best of John Lennon (1997)	Wonsaponatime (1998)	Instant Karma: All-Time Greatest Hits (2002)

Professional ratings
Review scores
Source	Rating
AllMusic	3/5 stars
The Rolling Stone Album Guide	4/5 stars

Tracklisting

All songs written by Lennon, except where noted.

No.	Title	Length
1.	"I'm Losing You"	4:06
2.	"Working Class Hero"	4:19
3.	"God"	3:32
4.	"How Do You Sleep?"	5:20
5.	"Imagine"	3:21
6.	"Baby Please Don't Go"	4:04
7.	"Oh My Love"	2:53
8.	"God Save Oz (with Bill Elliott and the Elastic Oz Band)"	3:27
9.	"I Found Out"	3:47
10.	"Woman Is the Nigger of the World (Live)"	5:14
11.	"A Kiss Is Just a Kiss"	0:11
12.	"Be-Bop-A-Lula"	2:52
13.	"Rip It Up/Ready Teddy"	2:32
14.	"What You Got"	1:14
15.	"Nobody Loves You (When You're Down and Out)"	5:38
16.	"I Don't Wanna Face It"	3:31
17.	"Real Love"	4:07
18.	"Only You"	3:24
19.	"Grow Old with Me (with new orchestration by George Martin)"	3:18
20.	"Sean's "In the Sky""	1:22
21.	"Serve Yourself"	3:47

== Certifications ==
Certifications for John Lennon Anthology
Region	Certification	Certified units/sales
United States (RIAA)	Gold	125,000^{^}
^{^} Shipments figures based on certification alone.
