= White Elephant (band) =

The White Elephant Orchestra, later known as White Elephant, otherwise known as Mike Mainieri & Friends, was a jazz-rock big band made up of session and studio musicians based in New York City.

Set up in the late 1960s as an experimental ensemble, under the direction of Mike Mainieri (arranger, composer, keyboards, liner notes, percussion, producer & vocals), band members included Michael Brecker (tenor), Frank Vicari (tenor), George Young (alto) and Ronnie Cuber (baritone) on saxes; Randy Brecker, Jon Faddis and Lew Soloff on trumpets; Barry Rogers & Jon Pierson on trombones; as well as Steve Gadd, Tony Levin, Donald MacDonald, Warren Bernhardt, Joe Beck, David Spinozza and Hugh McCracken in the rhythm section. The band also included Nick Holmes (songwriter & vocalist), Sue Manchester (vocalist), and Annie Sutton, aka Ann E. Sutton, (vocalist).

For the most part, their music was the result of late night jam sessions of various musicians who gathering in New York recording studios. They released one eponymous double LP, simply called White Elephant, on Just Sunshine Records in 1972. The final track on side 4 is a 7:10 version of "Auld Lang Syne". A promotional 7-inch single with two shorter versions of the song was sent to radio stations in time for the New Year.
