= Bo Grumpus =

American psychedelic rock band

- Origin: Boston, Massachusetts, United States
- Genres: Rock, psychedelic rock
- Years active: 1967-1968
- Past members: Eddie Mottau; Joe Hutchinson; Jim Colegrove; Ronnie Blake

Bo Grumpus is an American psychedelic rock band that originated in Boston, Massachusetts in 1967. They are best known for their debut album in 1968, Before the War, which was produced by Felix Pappalardi.
