= Number 9 Dream =

1974 song by John Lennon

"#9 Dream"
- The German single sleeve of the song

Single by John Lennon

from the album Walls and Bridges
- B-side: "What You Got"
- Released: 16 December 1974
- Recorded: July–August 1974
- Genre: Soft rock
- Length: 4:44
- Label: Apple
- Songwriter: John Lennon
- Producer: John Lennon

John Lennon singles chronology
"Whatever Gets You thru the Night" (1974)	"#9 Dream" (1974)	"Stand by Me" (1975)

Walls and Bridges track listing
- 12 tracks Side one: 1. "Going Down on Love"; 2. "Whatever Gets You thru the Night"; 3. "Old Dirt Road"; 4. "What You Got"; 5. "Bless You"; 6. "Scared"; Side two: 7. "#9 Dream"; 8. "Surprise, Surprise (Sweet Bird of Paradox)"; 9. "Steel and Glass"; 10. "Beef Jerky"; 11. "Nobody Loves You (When You're Down and Out)"; 12. "Ya Ya"

Official video
- "#9 Dream" on YouTube

"#9 Dream"

Single by R.E.M.

from the album Instant Karma: The Amnesty International Campaign to Save Darfur
- Released: May 2007
- Genre: Alternative rock
- Length: 4:39
- Label: Warner Bros.
- Songwriter: John Lennon

R.E.M. singles chronology
"Wanderlust" (2005)	"#9 Dream" (2007)	"Supernatural Superserious" (2008)

"#9 Dream" is a song written by John Lennon and first issued on his 1974 album Walls and Bridges. It was released as the second single from that album months later, on Apple Records catalogue Apple 1878 in the United States and Apple R6003 in the United Kingdom. It peaked at number 9 on the Billboard Hot 100, and it hit number 23 on the British singles chart. A video for the song was made in 2003.

== Background ==
"#9 Dream" came to Lennon in a dream. Lennon has said that the song was just "churned out" with "no inspiration".

That's what I call craftsmanship writing, meaning, you know, I just churned that out. I'm not putting it down, it's just what it is, but I just sat down and wrote it, you know, with no real inspiration, based on a dream I'd had.

— John Lennon, 1980

According to May Pang's website, two working titles for the song were "So Long Ago" and "Walls & Bridges". Pang also states that the phrase repeated in the chorus, "Ah! böwakawa poussé, poussé", came to Lennon in a dream and has no specific meaning. Pang added that Al Coury of Capitol Records initially protested against the use of the word "pussy" in the chorus, but after Lori Burton, the wife of studio engineer Roy Cicala, suggested that it should be sung as "poussé", as if in a foreign language, the lyrics were kept.

The song was notable as a favourite of Lennon's, despite his later claim that the song was a "throwaway". Pang said on the matter, "This was one of John's favorite songs, because it literally came to him in a dream. He woke up and wrote down those words along with the melody. He had no idea what it meant, but he thought it sounded beautiful."

== Content ==
Lennon liked the string arrangement he wrote for Harry Nilsson's rendition of "Many Rivers to Cross", originally by Jimmy Cliff, from the album Pussy Cats, so much that he decided to incorporate it into the song.

The backing vocal is provided by May Pang, Lennon's partner at the time. Lennon wrote and arranged the song around his dream, hence the title and atmospheric, dreamlike feel, including the use of cellos in the chorus. The song's intricate production is reminiscent of "Strawberry Fields Forever".

== Recording ==
The song was tracked at the Record Plant in New York City on 23 July 1974, under the working title "Walls and Bridges". Pang added her dreamy "John" overdub on 26 August 1974.

== Reception ==
It peaked at number 9 on the Billboard Hot 100, also peaking at number 10 on the Cashbox Top 100 in the US. It charted at number 23 on the UK Singles Chart and number 35 in Canada.

Billboard commented on the contrast with Lennon's previous single from Walls and Bridges, "Whatever Gets You Through the Night", stating that "#9 Dream" is a "soft rocker" with "strong production" values which it expected would reach the Top 5. Cash Box said that it "is milder and more gentle than ['Whatever Gets You Through the Night'] with fine and subdued instrumentation acting as mellow cushion to John's vocal" and said that "the lyrics are super." Record World said that Lennon's "best romantic ode since 'Imagine' exits with a chant reminiscent of ex-Beatle Harrison's 'My Sweet Lord.'"

== Personnel ==
The musicians who performed on the original recording were as follows:

- John Lennon – vocals, acoustic guitar
- The 44th Street Fairies: Lennon, May Pang, Lori Burton, Joey Dambra – backing vocals
- Ken Ascher – clavinet
- Jesse Ed Davis – guitar
- Nicky Hopkins – electric piano
- Arthur Jenkins – percussion
- Jim Keltner – drums
- Bobby Keys – saxophone
- Eddie Mottau – acoustic guitar
- Klaus Voormann – bass guitar

== Chart performance ==
=== Weekly charts ===
Weekly sales chart performance for "#9 Dream"
Chart (1974–1975)	Peak position
Canada Top Singles (RPM)	35
UK Singles (Official Charts)	23
US Billboard Hot 100	9
US Cash Box Top 100	10

=== Year-end charts ===
1975 annual sales chart performance for "#9 Dream"
Chart (1975)	Rank
US (Joel Whitburn's Pop Annual)	101

== Legacy ==
- R.E.M. covered the song and released it as a single from the 2007 benefit album Instant Karma: The Amnesty International Campaign to Save Darfur. The cover featured founding drummer Bill Berry, his only recording with R.E.M. between his 1997 retirement and the band's 2011 disbandment.
- The international version of the Instant Karma! album features a second cover of the song by A-ha.
- British novelist David Mitchell titled his second novel number9dream in homage to Lennon.
- Andrea Corr covered this song on her 2011 album, Lifelines.
- Bill Frisell included "Number 9 Dream" on his 2011 Lennon–McCartney tribute album, All We Are Saying.
- José González covered this song on the 2013 film soundtrack for The Secret Life of Walter Mitty.
