= My Mummy's Dead =

- 1972 Mexican EP

Song by John Lennon

from the album John Lennon/Plastic Ono Band
- Released: 11 December 1970
- Recorded: June 1970
- Studio: House on Nimes Road in Bel Air, California
- Genre: Folk, lo-fi
- Length: 0:49
- Label: Apple Records
- Songwriter: John Lennon
- Producers: John Lennon; Yoko Ono; Phil Spector

"My Mummy's Dead" is the closing song on the album John Lennon/Plastic Ono Band by John Lennon. The song was also released on a Mexican EP that also contained "Mother", "Isolation" and "Look at Me".

== Writing ==
It is one of the songs Lennon wrote concerning his mother, along with "Julia" and "Mother". The song is partially set to the tune of the English nursery rhyme "Three Blind Mice". It is in the key of C sharp major.

Unlike the primal screams on "Mother", the opening song on Plastic Ono Band, "My Mummy's Dead" ends the album with John singing without emotion with a monotone delivery. Author John Blaney suggests that Lennon's delivery "evokes a sense of Lennon's long-held emptiness". Music critic Johnny Rogan finds that the song "captures the menace of childhood fears through adult remembrance in a most disturbing fashion". Rock journalist Paul Du Noyer claims that the "blankness of John's delivery" makes the song one of the scariest and most chilling of Lennon's songs, despite being one of the simplest. Lennon himself stated that the plain, short, childlike lyrics are due to him trying to write the song as a form of haiku.

== Recording ==
Two takes of "My Mummy's Dead" were recorded in Bel Air, California, during the summer of 1970 as part of the demo tapes Lennon made in preparation for Plastic Ono Band. The first take was adapted for use on Plastic Ono Band. Unlike the other Plastic Ono Band songs on the demos, "My Mummy's Dead" was not rerecorded for the album. The second take was not processed and appeared on bootleg albums such as The Dream Is Over. The second take version was edited with the version released on Plastic Ono Band to produce a more complete version of the song, which aired on The Lost Lennon Tapes. The second take would later be released in 2004 on the Acoustic album.

== Reception ==
Authors Ben Urish and Ken Bielen describe "My Mummy's Dead" as "brief but powerful", stating that it produces a "memorable and chilling" effect and appropriately ends John Lennon/Plastic Ono Band by "capturing the essence of psychological pain and intimating at its persistence". Blaney finds the song to be "a concise expression of Lennon's primal experience". Music critic Wilfrid Mellers describes it as a "sickening cross between nursery rhyme...and TV commercial jingle" that takes us back to childhood in a "disabused and disillusioned" fashion.

Mellers sees Lennon's later song "Oh Yoko!" from the album Imagine to be a "positive counterpart" to "My Mummy's Dead", being addressed to his wife Yoko Ono rather than his mother. Mellers notes that both songs are in the same key and utilise the "Three Blind Mice" melody, which is also reminiscent of the melody of the Beatles' "All You Need Is Love".

== Personnel ==
- John Lennon – vocals, acoustic guitar

== Cover versions ==
The song was covered by The Minus 5 on The Lonesome Death of Buck McCoy.
