= May Pang =

American music executive (born 1950)

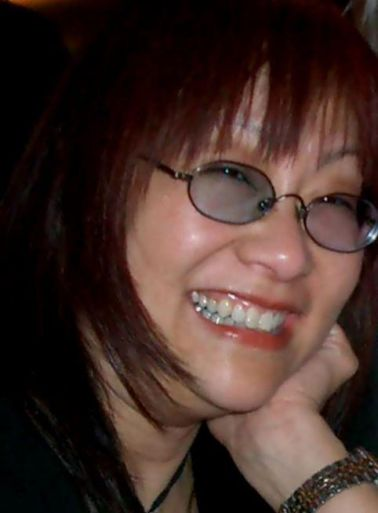
- Pang in 2002
- Born: May Fung Yee Pang; October 24, 1950 (age 76); New York City, U.S.
- Occupations: Personal assistant; production coordinator; jewellery designer; author
- Known for: Professional and personal relationship with John Lennon
- Spouse: Tony Visconti (m. 1989; div. 2000)
- Partner: John Lennon (1973–1975)
- Children: 2
- Website: maypang.com

May Pang
- Traditional Chinese: 龐鳳儀
- Simplified Chinese: 庞凤仪
Transcriptions
Standard Mandarin
- Hanyu Pinyin: Páng Fèngyí
- Wade–Giles: P'ang Feng-I
- Yale Romanization: Páng Fèngyí
- IPA: [pʰǎŋ fə̂ŋ.ǐ]
Yue: Cantonese
- Yale Romanization: Pòhng Fuhngyìh
- Jyutping: Pong4 Fung6ji4
- IPA: [pʰɔŋ˩ fʊŋ˨.ji˩]
Southern Min
- Hokkien POJ: Pâng Hōng-gî

May Fung Yee Pang (born October 24, 1950) is an American former music executive. She worked for John Lennon and Yoko Ono as a personal assistant and production coordinator. When Lennon and Ono separated in 1973, Pang and Lennon began a relationship that lasted more than 18 months. Lennon later referred to this time as his "Lost Weekend". Pang published two books about her relationship with Lennon: a memoir, Loving John (Warner, 1983); and a book of photographs, Instamatic Karma (St. Martin's Press, 2008). A documentary about their relationship, The Lost Weekend: A Love Story, was produced in 2022.

Pang was married to producer Tony Visconti from 1989 to 2000 and has two children.

== Early life ==
Pang was born in Manhattan, New York City. She is the daughter of Chinese immigrants and grew up in the Spanish Harlem section of New York City with an older sister and an adopted brother, both of whom were born in China. Pang's mother owned and operated a laundry business in the area. The Pang family left Spanish Harlem when the tenements where they lived were scheduled to be razed, moving to an apartment near 97th Street and 3rd Avenue in Manhattan.

After graduating from Saint Michael Academy, Pang attended New York City Community College. She aspired to be a model, but modeling agencies reportedly told her she was too "ethnic". Pang's early jobs included being a song plugger, which meant encouraging artists to record songs owned by music publishers. In 1970, she began work in New York as a receptionist at ABKCO Records, Allen Klein's management office, which at that time represented Apple Records and three former Beatles: Lennon, George Harrison and Ringo Starr.

Pang was asked to help Lennon and Ono with their avant-garde film projects, Up Your Legs Forever and Fly, in December 1970. Pang then became Lennon and Ono's secretary, factotum and gofer in New York City and Britain. This led to a permanent position as their personal assistant when the Lennons moved from London to Manhattan in 1971. Pang coordinated an art exhibition in Syracuse, New York, on October 9, 1971, for Ono's This Is Not Here art show at the Everson Museum. Ono's show coincided with Lennon's 31st birthday, and a party was held at the Hotel Syracuse, which was attended by Ringo Starr, Phil Spector, and Elliot Mintz.

== "Lost Weekend" ==
In mid-1973, Pang was working on the recording of Lennon's Mind Games album. Lennon and Ono were having marital problems, and Ono suggested to Pang that she become Lennon's companion. Ono explained that she and Lennon were not getting along, they had been arguing and were growing apart, and that Lennon would start seeing other women. She pointed out that Lennon had said he found Pang sexually attractive. Pang replied that she could never start a relationship with Lennon as he was her employer and married. Ono ignored Pang's protests and said that she would arrange everything. Ono later confirmed this conversation in an interview.

At the time Lennon had his 18-month relationship with Pang, he was in a period of his life that he later referred to as his "Lost Weekend", in reference to the film and novel of the same title.

In October 1973, Lennon and Pang left New York for Los Angeles to promote Mind Games, and decided to stay for a while, living at lawyer Harold Seider's apartment for a couple of days and then Lou Adler's house. While there, Lennon was inspired to embark on two recording projects: to make an album of the old rock 'n' roll songs that inspired him to become a musician, and to produce another artist. In December 1973, Lennon collaborated with Phil Spector to record the oldies album Rock 'n' Roll. Lennon's drinking and Spector's erratic behavior (which included his firing a gun in the studio control room) caused the sessions to break down. Then Spector, who claimed to have been in a car accident, took the session tapes and became unreachable.

In March 1974, Lennon began producing Harry Nilsson's Pussy Cats album, thus named to counter the "bad boy" image the pair had earned in the media with two drinking incidents at the Troubadour. The first was when Lennon placed a menstrual pad on his forehead and scuffled with a waitress at a concert given by Ann Peebles, who had released "I Can't Stand the Rain", one of Lennon's current favorite records; and the second, two weeks later when Lennon and Nilsson were ejected from the same club after heckling the Smothers Brothers. Lennon thought it would be a good idea for the musicians to live under one roof to ensure they would get to the studio on time, so Pang rented a beach house in Santa Monica for her, Lennon, Nilsson, Ringo Starr and Keith Moon to live. At this time, Pang encouraged Lennon to reach out to family and friends. He and Paul McCartney mended fences and played together for the first and only time after the breakup of the Beatles (see A Toot and a Snore in '74). Pang also arranged for Julian Lennon to visit his father for the first time in over two years.

Julian began to see his father more regularly. Lennon bought Julian a Gibson Les Paul copy guitar and a drum machine for Christmas in 1973, and encouraged Julian's interest in music by showing him some chords. "Dad and I got on a great deal better then," recalls Julian. "We had a lot of fun, laughed a lot and had a great time in general when he was with May Pang. My memories of that time with Dad and May are very clear—they were the happiest time I can remember with them." Pang herself addressed the situation in 2024: "Cynthia had raised Julian, and John eventually admitted to me that Cynthia had done a fantastic job raising him. I knew it was the right thing to do getting in touch with Julian and Cynthia. I felt so bad for Cynthia raising him on her own.”The cover of Julian's seventh album, Jude, features a childhood photo of him taken by Pang.

In June 1974, Lennon and Pang returned to live in Manhattan. Lennon stopped drinking and concentrated on recording. Lennon previously had cats while he lived at his Aunt Mimi's house in Liverpool; he and Pang adopted two cats that they named Major and Minor. In the early summer, Lennon was working on his Walls and Bridges album when the couple moved into a penthouse apartment at 434 East 52nd Street. On August 23, Lennon and Pang claimed to have seen a UFO from their terrace, which had a panoramic view of Queens. To gain access to the deck, Lennon and Pang had to climb out of their kitchen window. On the night in question, a naked Lennon excitedly called Pang to join him on the deck outside and they both watched a circular object silently floating less than 100 feet away. Lennon called Bob Gruen—Lennon's "official" photographer—and told him what had happened. Gruen suggested Lennon should call the police, but Lennon laughed it off, saying, "I’m not going to call up the newspaper and say 'This is John Lennon and I saw a flying saucer last night.'" Gruen called the local police precinct which confirmed that three other people had reported a sighting, and the Daily News wrote that five people had reported a sighting in the same area of New York where Lennon and Pang lived. Lennon refers to the incident in the song "Nobody Told Me".

Walls and Bridges rose to the top spot on the album charts. Lennon achieved his only number-one solo US single in his lifetime with "Whatever Gets You thru the Night". Pang's is the voice whispering Lennon's name on "#9 Dream". "Surprise, Surprise (Sweet Bird of Paradox)" was written about her. Julian played drums on the album's last track, "Ya Ya". While recording Walls and Bridges, Al Coury, vice president of promotion for Capitol Records, got possession of the chaotic Spector session tapes and brought them to New York. Lennon completed his oldies album, which was titled Rock 'n' Roll, with the same musicians he used on Walls and Bridges. Pang received an RIAA gold record award for her work on Walls and Bridges and continued her work as production coordinator of Lennon's Rock 'n' Roll album, where she was credited as "Mother Superior". Pang also worked on albums by Nilsson, Starr, Elton John, and David Bowie.

While visiting Mick Jagger at Andy Warhol's compound Eothen in Montauk, New York, Lennon and Pang saw a Scottish-style cottage for sale close to the Montauk Point Lighthouse. Lennon asked a real estate broker to put in an offer for it in February 1975. In the same month, Lennon and Pang were also planning on visiting Paul and Linda McCartney in New Orleans, where Wings were recording the Venus and Mars album, but Lennon reconciled with Ono the day before the planned visit, after Ono said she had a new cure for Lennon's smoking habit. After the meeting, he failed to return home or call Pang. When Pang telephoned the next day, Ono told her that Lennon was unavailable because he was exhausted after a hypnotherapy session. Two days later, Lennon reappeared at a joint dental appointment; he was stupefied and confused to such an extent that Pang believed he had been brainwashed. Lennon told Pang he had reconciled with Ono and their relationship was over. Over the coming years, Pang quietly met Lennon a few times but their relationship was never rekindled.

Lennon lamented this period publicly but not in private. Journalist Larry Kane, who befriended Lennon in 1964, wrote a comprehensive biography of Lennon which detailed the "Lost Weekend" period. In the interview with Kane, Lennon explained his feelings about his time with Pang; "You know Larry, I may have been the happiest I've ever been... I loved this woman (Pang), I made some beautiful music and I got so fucked up with booze and shit and whatever."

=== Pang's books about Lennon ===
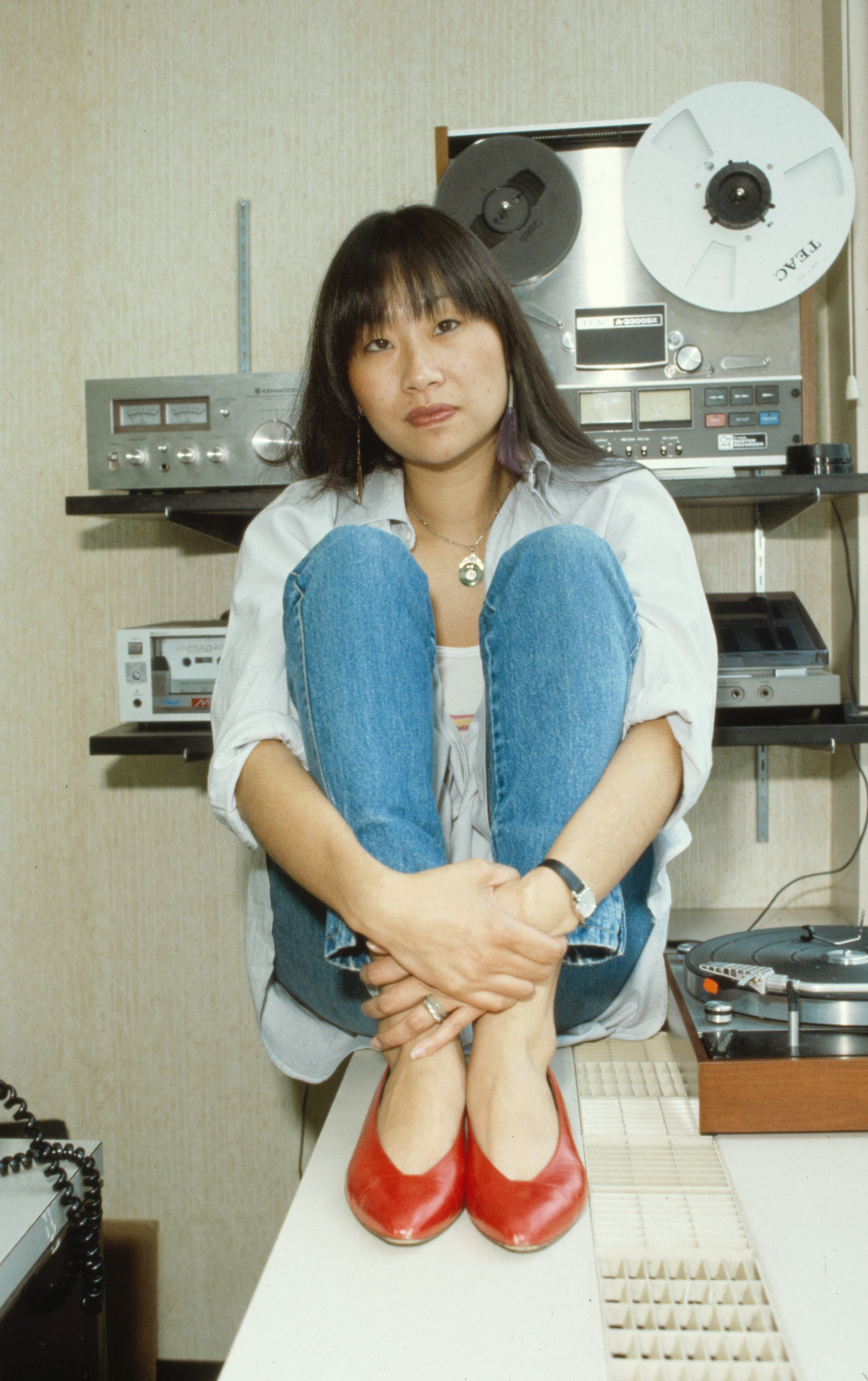
Pang in 1983

Pang published her memoir Loving John in 1983. It was updated and renamed John Lennon: The Lost Weekend. The original 500-page Loving John book focused mainly on Pang's role on Lennon's albums and sessions. It was edited down to 300 pages, concentrating mostly on the sensational aspects of their relationship. It also included postcards that Lennon had written to Pang during his travels throughout the world in the late 1970s. Pang claims that she and Lennon remained lovers until 1977, and stayed in contact until his death.

Pang's book of photographs, Instamatic Karma, was published in 2008. Besides the candid personal portraits, the book contains some historically important photographs, such as Lennon signing the official dissolution of the Beatles' partnership, and one of the last known photographs of Lennon and Paul McCartney together. Cynthia Lennon also provided a back cover endorsement, acknowledging Pang's role in reuniting Lennon with his estranged first son, Julian.

== The Lost Weekend documentary ==
The Tribeca Film Festival announced the 2022 premiere of The Lost Weekend: A Love Story, a 97-minute documentary about Pang's life and relationship with Lennon on June 10 via virtual home viewing. The film was produced and directed by Eve Brandstein, Richard S. Kaufman and Stuart Samuels. The Lost Weekend appeared in theaters internationally for a limited run April 13th and 14th 2023 and became available via streaming and on BluRay in October 2023.

== Photography ==
Coinciding with the release of the 2022 documentary, Pang published a collection of her photographs of Lennon which were made available for sale in a touring exhibition called The Lost Weekend: The Photography of May Pang.

== Jewelry ==
Pang started her own jewelry business. She designs stainless-steel feng shui jewelry.

== Subsequent personal life ==
After Lennon returned to Ono, Pang started working for United Artists Records and Island Records as a public relations manager, working on albums by Bob Marley and Robert Palmer. She married record producer Tony Visconti in 1989; the couple divorced in 2000. They had two children. Pang remains in touch with some of the people from her time with Lennon, and Paul McCartney invited her to Linda McCartney's memorial service—an invitation that was reportedly never extended to Yoko Ono. She was an invited guest at the Concert for George in 2002 and remained close to Cynthia Lennon and Lennon's first son, Julian.

Although having had no contact for 20 years, on October 9, 2006, Pang accidentally met Ono in Iceland, on what would have been Lennon's 66th birthday. Ono was in Iceland to unveil a sculpture in Reykjavík and was staying in the same hotel.

Pang volunteers with an animal shelter called Animal Haven in New York and owned a dog that was rescued after Hurricane Katrina. She also co-hosts an Internet talk radio show, Dinner Specials with Cynthia and May Pang, at blogtalkradio.com, with on-air partner Cynthia Nilson.
