= I Found Out =

Song by John Lennon

from the album John Lennon/Plastic Ono Band
- Released: 11 December 1970
- Recorded: 27 September 1970
- Studio: EMI, London
- Genre: Blues rock
- Length: 3:37
- Label: Apple/EMI
- Songwriter: John Lennon
- Producers: John Lennon, Yoko Ono, Phil Spector

"I Found Out" is a song by the English musician John Lennon from his 1970 album John Lennon/Plastic Ono Band.

== Writing and recording ==
The song expresses Lennon's disillusionment with a world dominated by what he saw as false religion and idols, and warns against being taken in by such beliefs.

Recorded at EMI Studios on 27 September 1970, the instrumentation, style, and production of the song are typical of Lennon's Plastic Ono Band era work. The song features a low, rumbling tremolo guitar, thumping drums, a rolling, minimal bass guitar line, and a scathing vocal delivery. The recording is bare-bones, in stark contrast to the heavy production of Lennon's later albums. It is influenced more heavily by blues music than other songs on Plastic Ono Band.

== Reception ==
In a review for Plastic Ono Band, website Classic Rock Review described "I Found Out" as a "dark but fine tune", describing the bass line as the track's highlight. Ultimate Classic Rock critic Nick DeRiso called "I Found Out" the most underrated song on John Lennon/Plastic Ono Band.

Stereogum contributors Timothy and Elizabeth Bracy rated it as Lennon's 8th best solo song, saying that "This is the artist at his funniest and most withering."

== Personnel ==
The musicians who performed on the original recording were as follows:

- John Lennon – vocals, fuzzed electric guitar
- Ringo Starr – drums
- Klaus Voormann – bass guitar

== Popular culture ==
The song was covered by the Red Hot Chili Peppers on Working Class Hero: A Tribute to John Lennon.

The song has also been recorded by Nathaniel Mayer on I Just Want to Be Held (2004).

The song was featured during the end credits of the sixth episode of season three of The Marvelous Mrs.Maisel.
