= Hold On (John Lennon song) =

Song by John Lennon

from the album John Lennon/Plastic Ono Band
- Released: 11 December 1970
- Recorded: 30 September 1970
- Studio: EMI, London
- Genre: Pop rock
- Length: 1:53
- Label: Apple Records
- Songwriter: John Lennon
- Producers: John Lennon, Yoko Ono, Phil Spector

"Hold On" is a song from the album John Lennon/Plastic Ono Band by John Lennon. It features only vocals, tremolo guitar, drums, and bass guitar, typical of the sparse arrangements Lennon favored at the time. On the 2000 reissue of John Lennon/Plastic Ono Band, "Hold On" features a slightly longer introduction. The original version was restored on the 2010 reissue.

== Composition and style ==
Described as "the most upbeat song on [Plastic Ono Band]", the song's theme is emotional fragility, as the lyrics state that when you're alone in the world you just have to "hold on." Lennon tries to assure himself that he and wife Yoko Ono have the strength to overcome their challenges, and if he holds on, "it's gonna be all right" and "we'll win the fight." Lennon explicitly namechecks himself and Yoko Ono, but author Andrew Jackson does not believe that this detracts from the universality of the message. Towards the end of the song Lennon expands the subject to encompass the whole world, singing that peace will be achievable when everyone will "see the light" and realize that we are all "one."

Musically, Lennon plays his guitar gently, applying tremolo, in an effect that Jackson states matches "the soothing reassurance of the lyrics." Recorded at EMI Studios on 30 September 1970, Lennon took 32 takes experimenting with different approaches before hitting on this one. However, music critics Wilfrid Mellers and Johnny Rogan state that other elements of the music create some tension with the reassuring message. These elements include Ringo Starr's "jittery" drumming, with many silences, and the fragmented vocal melody, which break up the sentences of the lyrics. In the middle of the song, Lennon mutters the word "cookie", imitating the Cookie Monster Muppet from the US children's television show Sesame Street.

Lennon has explained the song as follows:

I'm saying 'hold on John' because I don't want to die ... I don't want to be hurt and please don't hit me ... Hold on now, we might have a cup of tea, we might get a moment's happiness any minute now. So that's what it's about, just moment by moment. That's how we're living now, but really living like that and cherishing each day, and dreading it too. It might be your last.

== Personnel ==
The musicians who performed on the original recording were as follows:

- John Lennon – double-tracked vocals, tremolo electric guitar
- Ringo Starr – drums
- Klaus Voormann – bass guitar
