= Ron Aprea =

American musician

Ron Aprea is an American composer and musician. He has performed with Woody Herman, Les Elgart, Tito Puente, Frank Foster, Buddy Morrow, Billy May, Charlie Persip, Nat Adderley, Lionel Hampton, and Louis Armstrong.

== Career ==
While with Hamp's band, some of the highlights were a Ramsey Lewis television special, and a recorded concert at the Smithsonian Institution, where Ron's solos were taped and put into their Archives. Aprea was the featured soloist and arranger for performances with Nat Adderley at the world-famous Apollo Theatre, and he also performed at the Paramount Theatre with King Curtis' Big Band. Aprea has played shows for hundreds of stars, including Clint Holmes, Rita Moreno, Robert Merrill, Chita Rivera, Rich Little, and Billy Eckstine.

== Recording and Albums ==
In 1974, Aprea recorded with John Lennon and Elton John on the album entitled Walls and Bridges. The all-star horn section included Howard Johnson, Frank Vicari, and Steve Madeo. Aprea was a featured soloist on the jazz-gospel album Free to Be Free.

Aprea's compositions, arrangements, and production skills can be heard on Angela DeNiro's first CD, Just For the Fun Of It, as well as her second release, Angela DeNiro... Swingin' With Legends, featuring Lionel Hampton, Frank Foster, and Lew Tabackin.

== Collaborations with Angela DeNiro ==
Ron and Angela performed at the Five Towns College Jazz Concert in 1998 and 1999. Aprea was featured with the Kenny Barron Trio at the 1998 Lionel Hampton Jazz Festival, and was part of the All-Star cast, which included Frank Foster, Frank Wess, Bill Watrous, Jon Faddis, Al Grey, Ray Brown, Marion McPartland, Abbey Lincoln, and Diana Krall.

During the summer of 1998, Aprea performed at the Planting Fields Arboretum in New York, where he and Angela DeNiro again appeared as guest artists in concert with Lionel Hampton's Big Band.

== Grammy Nominations ==
In 1998, Ron's production of Angela DeNiro's "Swingin' With Legends" album, featuring Lionel Hampton, Frank Foster, Lew Tabackin, and Ron's all-star 16-piece big band, received 8 GRAMMY nomination entries, 3 of which were: Producer of the Year, and Best Instrumental Arrangement Accompanying a Vocalist for Angela DeNiro's "Avalon" & "The Song Is You."

== Television Appearances ==
In January 2001, Aprea's band, with Angela DeNiro, was featured on "BET-TV". The national program, called "Jazz Discovery", showcased jazz artists in competition, and was judged by a panel of three, which included Chick Corea. Angela, with Ron's band, won. Later that year, Aprea completed an arranging assignment for vocalist Alex Donner, featuring nine of Aprea's arrangements. Donner released the first of a 2-CD set in the spring of 2001. Aprea also co-hosted a weekly jazz radio show on WSHR, 91.9 FM, New York, with his wife, vocalist Angela DeNiro.

== Guest Appearances and Performances ==
Ron and Angela DeNiro made a cameo appearance on the jazz vocalist Mark Murphy's album, Links, released in September 2001 on the High Note Label. In August 2001, Aprea performed in an All-Star band for a Charlie Parker Birthday tribute in Harlem, New York. The band featured four alto saxophonists. Playing alongside Aprea were Jimmy Zaff, Gerald Hayes, and James Spaulding. The rhythm section featured Danny Mixon on piano, Bob Cunningham on bass, and Andre Strobaer on drums.

== Compositions and Tributes ==
Aprea wrote for Angela DeNiro's third CD, My Shining Hour. One of his compositions, "For Phil," is dedicated to Phil Woods. This CD was released in August 2005. International Performances

In 2007, Aprea and his wife headlined les Nuits du Jazz Festival, in Nantes, France, and were featured with the Côte Ouest Big Band, under the direction of Jean-Phillipe Vidal.

== Recent Projects ==
On June 5, 2013, Aprea released his own album entitled Ron Aprea Sextet-Remembering Blakey, Aprea's tribute to Art Blakey and his Jazz Messengers. Aprea's front line on this album was Joe Magnarelli-trpt., Jerry Weldon-tenor, and Aprea on alto. The rhythm section was Cecilia Coleman-piano, Tim Givens-bass, and Vince Cherico-drums. The album is a mix of originals and standards. Aprea has two of his own originals, "Sophia" (written for his granddaughter) and "For Pete's Sake" (written for the late bassist and close friend Pete Chivily).
