= Whatever Gets You thru the Night =

1974 single by John Lennon

- The cover of the French single

Single by John Lennon

from the album Walls and Bridges
- B-side: "Beef Jerky"
- Released: 23 September 1974 (US); 4 October 1974 (UK)
- Recorded: June–July 1974
- Genre: Pop; funk; R&B; yacht rock
- Length: 3:27
- Label: Apple
- Songwriter: John Lennon
- Producer: John Lennon

John Lennon singles chronology
"Mind Games" (1973)	"Whatever Gets You thru the Night" (1974)	"#9 Dream" (1974)

Music video
- "Whatever Gets You Thru the Night" on YouTube

"Whatever Gets You thru the Night" is a song written by John Lennon, released as a single in 1974 on Apple Records, catalogue number Apple 1874 in the United States and Apple R5998 in the United Kingdom. In the U.S. it peaked at No. 1 on all three record charts: Billboard Hot 100, Cashbox, and Record World, and at No. 36 in the UK. It was the lead single for Lennon's album Walls and Bridges; in the UK the single was released on the same day as the album. "Whatever Gets You thru the Night" was Lennon's only solo No. 1 single in the United States during his lifetime, making him the last member of the Beatles to reach the top of the charts. In Canada, the single spent two weeks at No. 2, and became the 30th biggest hit of 1974.

== Writing ==
The inspiration for the lyrics came from late-night television. In December 2005, May Pang told Radio Times: 'At night [Lennon] loved to channel-surf, and would pick up phrases from all the shows. One time, he was watching Reverend Ike, a famous black evangelist, who was saying, 'Let me tell you guys, it doesn't matter, it's whatever gets you through the night.' John loved it and said, 'I've got to write it down or I'll forget it.' He always kept a pad and pen by the bed. That was the beginning of "Whatever Gets You thru the Night".'

The music was inspired by the No. 1 single at the time, "Rock Your Baby" by George McCrae. Although the released track bears little resemblance, the inspiration is more apparent on the alternative version released on John Lennon Anthology.

== Content ==
The recording featured Elton John on harmony vocals and piano. While in the studio, Elton bet Lennon that the song would top the charts, and such was Lennon's scepticism that Elton secured from him a promise to appear on stage at one of his performances, should the record indeed hit No. 1. When the record did achieve that feat, Lennon appeared at John's Thanksgiving performance at Madison Square Garden on 28 November 1974. It was Lennon's last major concert appearance. There is very little footage of the concert available as of August 2026.

"Whatever Gets You thru the Night" was not Lennon's first choice for a single. It was chosen by Capitol Records vice-president Al Coury, who had recently worked his singles 'magic' with Paul McCartney's album Band on the Run. Lennon created a promotional film for the song, in which he lip-synced the first verse while walking through Manhattan.

In 1991, Yoko Ono created an alternate video for the song that appeared the following year on The John Lennon Video Collection. The video features animations of Lennon's drawings, which were lifted from the 1986 short film The John Lennon Sketchbook and directed by John Canemaker.

In 2007, Yoko Ono granted Amnesty International the opportunity to have a number of bands cover Lennon's solo songbook, which included this song. Los Lonely Boys and Les Trois Accords performed it as the second single from the Instant Karma: The Amnesty International Campaign to Save Darfur album.

The live recording with the Elton John Band was released in 1981 on the EP 28 November 1974. The recording is also available on the box set Lennon (1990) and the 1996 expanded/remastered edition of Elton John's album Here and There (1976).

== Reception ==
Cash Box stated, "The production is excellent and the arrangement is full, using diverse instrumentation. Lennon's lyric as always is catchy and the driving rhythms have this moving up extra fast."

== Charts ==
=== Weekly charts ===
Chart (1974–1975)	Peak position
Australia (Kent Music Report)	34
Canada RPM Top Singles	2
Italy (Musica e dischi)	12
Netherlands	21
South Africa (Springbok Radio)	15
UK Singles (Official Charts)	36
US Billboard Hot 100	1
US Cash Box Top 100	1

=== Year-end charts ===
Chart (1974)	Rank
Canada	30

== Personnel ==
The musicians who performed on the original recording were:

- John Lennon – lead vocals, guitar
- Elton John – harmony vocals, piano, organ
- Bobby Keys – tenor saxophone
- Ken Ascher – clavinet
- Jesse Ed Davis – electric guitar
- Eddie Mottau – acoustic guitar
- Klaus Voormann – bass
- Jim Keltner – drums
- Arthur Jenkins – percussion
- Ron Aprea – alto saxophone

The musicians who performed on the 1974 live recording largely comprised Elton John's band:

- John Lennon – guitar, vocals
- Elton John – harmony vocal, piano
- Davey Johnstone – guitar
- Dee Murray – bass
- Nigel Olsson – drums
- Ray Cooper – percussion
- The Muscle Shoals Horns
