= Nobody Loves You (When You're Down and Out) =

Song by John Lennon

from the album Walls and Bridges
- Published: Lennon Music/ATV Music Ltd.
- Released: 26 September 1974 (US); 4 October 1974 (UK)
- Recorded: July–August 1974
- Studio: Record Plant, New York City
- Genre: Rock
- Length: 5:08
- Label: Apple Records
- Songwriter: John Lennon
- Producer: John Lennon

"Nobody Loves You (When You're Down and Out)" is a song written by John Lennon released on his 1974 album Walls and Bridges. The song is included on the 1986 compilation Menlove Ave., the 1990 box set Lennon, the 1998 box set John Lennon Anthology, the 2005 two-disc compilation Working Class Hero: The Definitive Lennon, and the 2010 box set Gimme Some Truth.

== Lyrics and music ==
Lennon wrote "Nobody Loves You (When You're Down and Out)" early in his time in Los Angeles during his separation from wife Yoko Ono, often called his "lost weekend." The song reflects his feelings of depression and loneliness during that time. Lennon recorded an acoustic demo as early as October 1973. Besides his separation from Ono, the lyrics are also influenced by Lennon's disappointment at the negative reception his recent work had received from critics and the public, and his feelings of having been cheated by the music industry. The lyrics describe the emptiness he felt as well as his disillusionment with show business. Various lines could be taken as cynical responses to Ono, or to Lennon's audience and music critics. In response to the question of whether he loves someone, the singer responds "it's all showbiz." The lyrics also seem to express resentment Lennon felt about being the one who had to awaken people to what was happening, and was still not appreciated, with lyrics about how he's "been across to the other side" and "shown you everything." Lines about crossing the water to see "one eyed witchdoctors" may refer to Lennon's disillusionment with the Maharishi, or his partial success with Arthur Janov. The song ends cynically, with the line "Everybody loves you when you're six-foot in the ground." Another line which adds to the cynicism is "I'll scratch your back and you knife mine."

Authors Ken Bielen and Ben Urish describe Lennon's voice for the song as "hoarse," claiming that the production helps give "an alienated ambiance to his lethargic (but not dull) vocal performance." They also claim that the horn section adds to the "thick musical overcast," as does Jesse Ed Davis' guitar solo, which they compare to a "howling wolf." The song changes tempo when the lyrics move from apathy to emotional outbursts.

The title comes from the 1923 blues song "Nobody Knows You When You're Down and Out," which had been covered by Eric Clapton with Derek and the Dominos in 1970.

Lennon said that "Nobody Loves You (When You're Down and Out)" was an ideal song for Frank Sinatra to sing. Rock journalist Paul Du Noyer claims the song has a "low key, late night feel" reminiscent of such Sinatra songs as "One for My Baby (and One More for the Road)" and "In the Wee Small Hours of the Morning."

The judge hearing the lawsuit that Morris Levy initiated against Lennon over the similarities between the Beatles' "Come Together" and Chuck Berry's "You Can't Catch Me" quoted lyrics from "Nobody Loves You (When You're Down and Out)," claiming that the words "everybody's hustling for a buck and a dime" were an ideal introduction to the case.

== Reception ==
Author John Blaney calls "Nobody Loves You (When You're Down and Out)" the "signature tune" of the lost weekend. Bielen and Urish claim that it "captures the essence of a three o'clock in the morning, bleary-eyed, self pitying, booze-drenched interior monologue," and that it contains "a certain bravado and grandeur...that makes the weary emptiness of the verses and the impotent rage of the refrains eloquent and poignant." Journalist Paul Du Noyer calls it a "colossal ballad" which "sounds nothing but sincere" despite being "a sprawling testament to John's cynicism and self-pity." According to Chip Madinger and Mark Easter, Lennon had "rarely penned more honest words in his life." Music critic Jimmy Nelson called it a "moment of brutal honesty about separation and longing." Pop historian Robert Rodriguez praises Jesse Ed Davis' "incredibly fluid" guitar lead. Ultimate Classic Rock critic Nick DeRiso called the song the most underrated track on Walls and Bridges.

== Other versions ==
An earlier rehearsal version of the song was issued on Menlove Ave., recorded on 13 July 1974 at Record Plant, Studio C, New York, featuring minimal instrumentation and differing lyrics. For example, the line on Walls and Bridges "I'll scratch your back, you knife mine" appears in the rehearsal as "I'll scratch your back, you scratch mine."

Author John Blaney finds that rehearsal version even more melancholy than the version on Walls and Bridges, claiming that Lennon's whistling at the beginning of the song gives the version a "sense of lonely isolation" and that Jesse Ed Davis' guitar "exacts palpable moans and cries of despair." Rogan believes that the Menlove Ave. rehearsal "sounds slight" compared to the Walls and Bridges version, but still feels it makes an "interesting addendum to the Lennon catalogue."

John Lennon Anthology uses take 19, a studio outtake from the 17 July 1974 session that yielded the album master (take 23).

A further outtake appeared as a bonus track on the 2005 remix of Walls and Bridges, presented in a mix where only Lennon's vocal and acoustic guitar are heard.

== Personnel ==
The musicians who performed on the original recording were as follows:

- John Lennon – vocals, acoustic guitar
- Jesse Ed Davis – electric guitar
- Klaus Voormann – bass
- Nicky Hopkins – piano
- Ken Ascher – organ
- Jim Keltner – drums
- Bobby Keys, Steve Madaio, Howard Johnson, Ron Aprea, Frank Vicari – horns
- The Philharmonic Orchestrange – strings and brass, arranged and conducted by Ken Ascher
