= Eddie Mottau =

American guitarist (1943–2024)

- Born: December 10, 1943; Boston, Massachusetts, U.S.
- Died: November 3, 2024 Peterborough NH
- Genres: Rock
- Occupation: Musician
- Instrument: Guitar

Eddie Mottau (December 10, 1943 – November 3, 2024) was an American guitarist, song writer and record producer. His career has included membership in the duo Two Guys from Boston, The Bait Shop, Bo Grumpus, and Jolliver Arkansaw. He previously worked as a sought-after session musician in New York and Los Angeles, with artists such as Creation, Jackie DeShannon, John Lennon, Yoko Ono, Felix Pappalardi, David Peel, and Paul Stookey.

== Career ==
Mottau was part of the folk duo Two Guys from Boston, with Joe Hutchinson and recorded "Come on Betty Home" and "Shimmy Like My Sister Kate" for Scepter Records released in 1964. The duo moved to Greenwich Village shortly after the release of the single and were regular performers at The Gaslight Cafe, The Bitter End, Gertie's Folk City, and the Cafe Wha. The Duo then formed a band called Bo Grumpus which included drummer Norman Smart, formally of Mountain and Jim Colegrove, of Great Speckled Bird, on Bass Guitar. Bo Grumpus recorded an album titled Before the War, which was produced by Felix Pappalardi for Atlantic Records. The band then became Joliver Arkansaw and released an album titled Home in 1969 for Bell Records that was also produced by Pappalardi.

In 1971, Mottau was invited to join bassist/producer Jim Mason, producer of the bands Poco and Orleans, to play guitar and co-produce the first solo album of Paul Stookey, best known as a member of Peter, Paul and Mary.

Mottau's first solo album, No Turning Around, was released in 1973 on MCA Records. The album was produced by Stookey, and featured jazz great Jerry Mulligan. No Turning Around was re -released by MCA Records in Japan in 2001.

Mottau collaborated and played guitar on John Lennon's albums Walls and Bridges, Some Time in New York City, and Rock 'n' Roll. joining the Lennon all star band, including Jim Keltner, Klaus Voorman, Jesse Ed Davis, and Kenny Asher. Mottau was awarded a gold record for his contribution on the "walls and Bridges album, which charted at #1 with "Whatever Gets You Through the Night". Mottau went on tour with Lennon and Yoko Ono appearing at the Attica State concert at the Apollo Theater in New York City and the John Sinclair Freedom Rally in Ann Arbor, Michigan, in 1971.He appeared with Lennon and Ono on the Dick Cavett show in 1971 and 1972.

Mottau's next solo album, No Moulding, was released in 1977 by Neworld. No Moulding was re-released in digitized format in the fall of 2020.

In 2004, he recorded a record as a member of the trio Mottau, Drew & Clark, with bass player, singer-songwriter Jimmy Clark, and drummer and percussionist Bob Drew, producing the album Dance for Love.

He produced an album titled Converstions by singer, songwriter Wendy Keith in 2008

On October 1, 2020, Mottau, Drew & Clark released a new album titled Revelation/Revolution.

In 2022 Mottau co produced "FAZ NOW AND THEN" for Paul Stookey

== Personal life ==
Mottau married his wife, Kathy, in 1963. They had two children, Christine, an artist living in NYC. and Ed Jr. an artist, musician, craftsman, who died March 4, 2024. The Mottau's moved to New Hampshire in the 1970's from New York City. Kathy died in December 2018 at the age of 75. She had been the director of Kids Together, an after-school program based in Peterborough, New Hampshire, up until June 2017.

Edward Stanton Mottau died November 3, 2024 at his home in Peterborough NH.
