= Frank Vicari =

American jazz saxophonist (1931–2006)

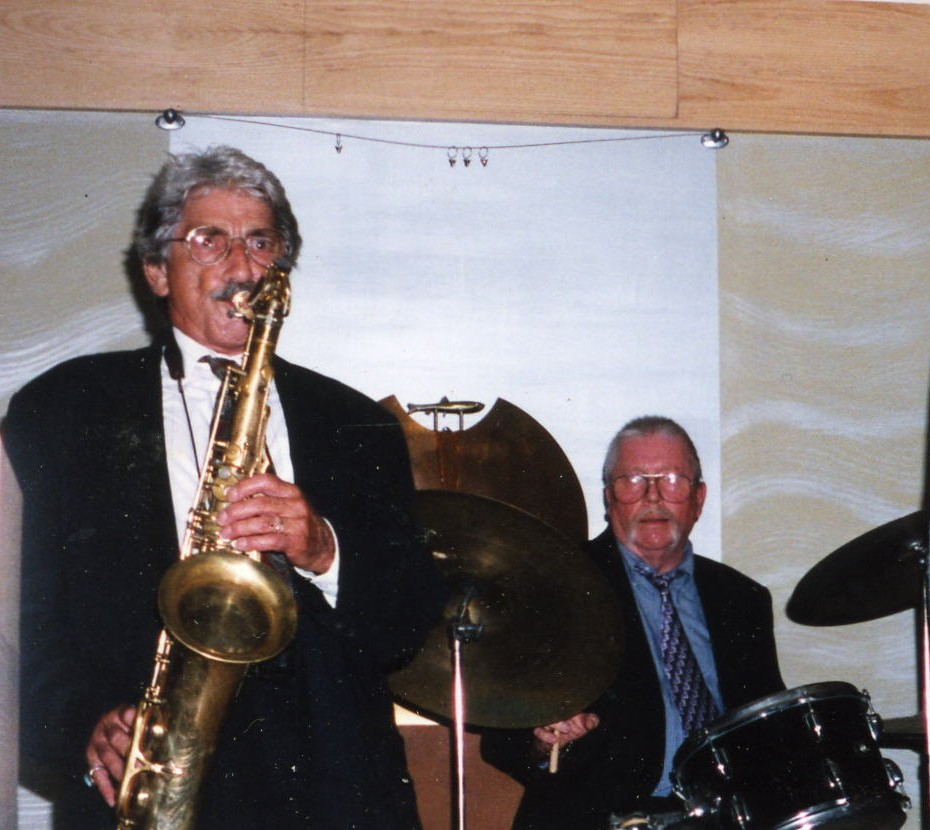
- Vicari on left

Background information
- Born: January 11, 1931
- Died: October 20, 2006 (aged 75) New York City
- Genres: Jazz
- Occupation: Musician
- Instrument: Saxophone

Frank Vicari (April 11, 1931 – October 20, 2006) was a jazz saxophonist.

== Career ==
After serving in the Air Force from 1951 to 1955, where he played in service bands, Vicari returned to New York City and played in bands until he joined Maynard Ferguson's big band in 1960.

When the Ferguson band broke up in 1965, Vicari briefly joined Buddy Rich, then Woody Herman and his Thundering Herd, where he remained until 1970. Vicari worked with Steve Gadd, Mike Mainieri, Randy and Michael Brecker, Dave Matthews, the White Elephant Orchestra, George Benson, Tony Bennett, Dionne Warwick, Billy Eckstein, Tom Waits, John Lennon, Woody Herman, and the Saturday Night Live Band.

He died in New York at the age of 75.

== Discography ==
=== As sideman ===
With George Benson

- Good King Bad (CTI, 1976)
- Pacific Fire (CTI, 1983)
- Space (CTI, 1978)

With Maynard Ferguson

- The New Sounds of Maynard Ferguson (Cameo, 1963)
- Come Blow Your Horn (Cameo, 1963)
- Color Him Wild (Mainstream, 1964)
- The Blues Roar (Mainstream, 1964)
- Ridin' High (Enterprise, 1968)
- Color Me Wild (Mainstream, 1974)
- The Big F (Mainstream, 1974)

With Woody Herman

- The Jazz Swinger (Columbia, 1966)
- Heavy Exposure (Cadet, 1969)
- Light My Fire (Cadet, 1969)
- Double Exposure (Chess, 1976)

With Tom Waits

- Foreign Affairs (Asylum, 1977)
- Blue Valentine (Asylum, 1978)
- Bounced Checks (Asylum, 1981)

With others

- James Brown, Hell (Polydor, 1995)
- Geils, Monkey Island (Atlantic, 1977)
- Gotham, Pass the Butter (Natural Resources, 1972)
- Urbie Green, Señor Blues (CTI, 1977)
- Art Farmer, Something You Got (CTI, 1977)
- Corky Laing, Makin' It On the Street (Elektra, 1977)
- John Lennon, Walls and Bridges (Apple, 1974)
- Mike Mainieri, White Elephant (NYC, 1994)
- The Manhattan Transfer, The Manhattan Transfer (Atlantic, 1975)
- David Matthews, Night Flight (Muse, 1977)
- David Matthews, Big Band Recorded Live at the Five Spot (Muse, 1980)
- Bette Midler, Broken Blossom (Atlantic, 1977)
- Blue Mitchell, Many Shades of Blue (Mainstream, 1974)
- Esther Phillips, From a Whisper to a Scream (Kudu, 1971)
- Esther Phillips, For All We Know (Kudu, 1976)
- Dana Valery, Dana Valery (Phantom, 1975)
- T-Bone Walker, Very Rare (Reprise, 1973)
- Leslie West, The Great Fatsby (Phantom, 1975)
- Leslie West, The Leslie West Band (Phantom, 1975)
- White Elephant, White Elephant (Just Sunshine, 1972)
