= Imagine (1972 film) =

1972 television film

- Cover of the 2018 remastered version
- Genre: Feature-length Music Film
- Written by: John Lennon & Yoko Ono
- Directed by: John Lennon; Yoko Ono
- Starring: John Lennon; Yoko Ono; Fred Astaire; Dick Cavett; Miles Davis; George Harrison; Jack Nicholson; Jack Palance; Dan Richter; Andy Warhol
- Composers: John Lennon; Yoko Ono
- Countries of origin: United Kingdom; United States
- Original language: English

Production
- Production locations: New York City; Tittenhurst Park
- Editors: Yoko Ono; John Lennon
- Running time: 68 minutes
- Production company: Joko Films

Original release
- Release: 23 December 1972

Imagine is a 1972 feature-length music film by John Lennon and Yoko Ono, filmed at their Tittenhurst Park home in Ascot, Berkshire, England, and in various locations in London and New York between May and September 1971. All the songs from Lennon's 1971 Imagine album appear in the soundtrack, and also the songs "Mrs. Lennon", "Mind Train", "Don't Count the Waves" and "Midsummer New York" from Ono's 1971 album Fly.

== Synopsis ==
Widely regarded as one of the first album-based longform music films, Imagine was a ground-breaking movie featuring a distinct visual treatment for every song, interspersed with occasional slices of Lennon and Ono's life together and improvised fantasy and comedy sequences featuring John and Yoko, Fred Astaire, Dick Cavett, Miles Davis, George Harrison, Jack Nicholson, Jack Palance, Dan Richter, Andy Warhol and others.

== Production ==
Lennon said of the improvised nature of the film at the time, "The one we're making now is very loose; they just bring the camera every day and we just decide what to do that day."

Ono said of the now-famous film for the song "Imagine", "It just happened naturally. I was well aware of the symbolism of everything – closing and then opening the shutters to let the light in. It's rather personal, but I had a definite reason why I smiled at the end, in addition to loving being next to John."

Lennon talking about their film-making together, said, "Yoko's quite adept in film-making and she'd made quite a few films before I'd met her. I used to make 8mm films at home and superimpose and do tricks with it and just play arbitrary records with it. But when I met Yoko she said, 'Well why don't you do it seriously?' So she sort of helped me to develop in that area and I find it's very similar to recording, just visual. And it's beautiful to work with. When we did Imagine, we felt great about it, and were saying, 'This is going to widen the field of film! This is it! This is the seventies! We started off...we were going to do a few clips and we ended up filming every song on the album and a few from Yoko's album too, and we ended up with a seventy-minute film. It only has two words in it: "Good morning". And all the rest is music. So it's like a musical. It's fairly wild and we made it up as we went along."

On the creative process and the film for the song "Jealous Guy", Ono said, "We enjoyed making films together. John came up with big ideas, or ideas that seemed big to me at the time. He thought of using a helicopter, which added a new dimension to our film. When John first said, 'Let's use a helicopter', I – who was supposed to have sold out in a big way – thought, 'Oh dear, aren't we getting a bit Hollywood?' The result was that beautiful scene in 'Jealous Guy'. There was nothing so-called 'Hollywood' about that."

Of the final scene in the film, Ono said, "John was the most romantic man I ever encountered. We were on South Beach on Staten Island. 'Let's really upset them and end the film with us walking on water.' (I'll let you guess whose idea that was!) We tried – that is, I know it looked a bit awkward, but it was a windy day and the waves were rough. Anyway, what you see is what you get. Enjoy."

Speaking in 2018, Ono said of the film, "The people who all worked on Imagine were Peace People and it was so enlightening and exciting all the way through to be one of them. Remember, each one of us has the power to change the world."

== Film track listing ==
1. "Imagine" *
2. "Crippled Inside" *
3. "Good Morning"
4. "Jealous Guy" *
5. "Don't Count the Waves" †
6. "It's So Hard" *
7. "Mrs. Lennon" †
8. In Bag
9. "I Don't Wanna Be a Soldier Mama I Don't Wanna Die" *
10. "Mind Train" †
11. Whisper Piece
12. What's That in the Sky?
13. "Power to the People" ‡
14. "Gimme Some Truth" *
15. "Midsummer New York" †
16. "Oh My Love" *
17. "How Do You Sleep?" *
18. "How?" *
19. "Oh Yoko!" *
20. Beach / End Credits

* from the John Lennon album Imagine
† from the Yoko Ono album Fly
‡ from the John Lennon single "Power to the People"

Track listing sourced from 2018 Blu-ray release, UPC code: 5051300536978 and official website.

== 2018 DVD/Blu-ray extra features ==
Bundled with the film, Gimme Some Truth: The Making of John Lennon's Imagine Album.

1. "Jealous Guy" (Raw Studio out-take)
2. "How?" (Raw Studio out-take)
3. "Gimme Some Truth" (Raw Studio out-take)
4. David Bailey photoshoot

Track listing sourced from 2018 Blu-ray release, UPC code: 5051300536978

== Production credits ==
- Directed by and starring John & Yoko.
- Produced by Joko Films.
- Guest stars: Fred Astaire, Dick Cavett, George Harrison, Jonas Mekas, Jack Palance.
- Also appearing: Desire De Freitas, Setsuko Ono, Dan Richter, Diana Robertson and many others
- Cameramen: Nic Knowland, Bob Fries, John Metcalf, Richard Stanley, Jonas Mekas.
- Camera assistants: Andy Carchrae, Jimmy Dibling, Chris Morfitt, Dick Pope, Doug Ibold.
- Sound recordists: Charlie Bagnall, Ivan Sharrock, Garth Marshall, Mike McDuffy, Dixie Dean.
- Production managers: Franco Rosso, Gerry Harrison, Steve Gebhardt.
- Edited by Yoko & John.
- Assistant editors: Bob Fries, Doug Ibold, Richard Key, Janice Davidson.
- Animation sequence: Carmen D'Avino.
- Optical printing: The Optical House.
- Business manager, ABKCO: Allen Klein.
- Promotions manager: Pete Bennett.
- A&R: Allan Steckler.
- Road manager: Mal Evans.
- Production assistants: George Maciunas, Dan Richter, Peter Bendrey, May Pang, Paul Mozian.
- Secretary: Diana Robertson.
- This and That: Tom Basalari, Arlene Reckson.
- Catering: Val Wilde.
- Chauffeurs: Les Anthony, Joe Marchini.
- Filmed: May to September, 1971.
- Music from Imagine by John Lennon and Fly by Yoko Ono on Apple Records.
- Music produced by John & Yoko and Phil Spector.
- Musicians: John Lennon, George Harrison, Klaus Voormann, Nicky Hopkins, Alan White, Jim Keltner, King Curtis, John Barham, Rod Lynton, Ted Turner, Joey Molland, Tom Evans, Mike Pinder, Jim Gordon, John Tout, Andy Davis, Chris Osborne, Rosetta Hightower & choir, Joe Jones Tone Deaf Music Co., Phil Spector, The Flux Fiddlers.
- Orchestrations: Torrie Zito.
- Engineers: Phil McDonald, Eddie Klein, Eddy Offord, Eddie Veale, Roy Cicala, Shelly Yakus, Jack Douglas, Bob Fries, Jay Messina, Dennis Ferrante.
- Recorded and mixed at Ascot Sound Studios, EMI Studios Abbey Road and Record Plant, New York, February to July, 1971.

Credits sourced from 2018 Blu-ray release, UPC Code: 5051300536978

== 2018 HD restoration credits ==
Film and audio remastering (2010–2018)

- Producer and creative direction: Yoko Ono.
- Restoration editor and production manager: Simon Hilton.

Film Restoration (2010–2018)

- Produced by Yoko Ono.
- Film preservation production team: Simon Hilton, James Chads, Hannah Arcaro, Thom Hill, Paulina Anderson, Adam Farrington, Benjamin Baker, Lee Merricks, Sam Gannon, Beth Walsh, Olivia McShane, Alex Miles and Jake Blunden.
- Transfers: Dave Northrop, Bruce W Goldstein, Scott Delaney, Jack Serrani, Stephen Walsh, Rob DeSaro, Beth Simon, Elle Crowley and Andre Macaluso at Deluxe Northvale.
- Digital restoration: Venancio David, Brett Bone, Miguel Algora, Kate Warburton, Madeleine Shenai, Gary & Georgina Brown at Munky.
- Mastergrade: Simona Cristea, Nic Knowland, Mireille Antoine and Joce Capper at Rushes London.

Imagine 5.1 and Stereo Audio Remixes (2016–2018)

- Produced by Yoko Ono.
- Mixed & Engineered by Paul Hicks at Abbey Road Studios and Sear Sound
- Engineer: Audio Sourcing, Match and Tracklay: Sam Gannon.
- Mastered by Gavin Lurssen, Reuben Cohen and Paul Hicks at Lurssen Mastering.
- Production Manager: Simon Hilton.
- Multitrack & ¼" Transfers: Matthew Cocker at Abbey Road Studios.
- Film Audio ¼" Transfers: Scott Delaney at Deluxe Northvale.
- Lenono Audio Archive: Rob Stevens.
- Abbey Road Studios Library: Cary Anning.
- Production Co-ordinators: Colette Barber at Abbey Road Studios, Roberta Findlay at Sear Sound NYC and Nikki Nieves at Lurssen Mastering.

Credits sourced from 2018 Blu-ray Release, UPC Code: 5051300536978

== Versions released ==
John & Yoko's 1972 theatrical version of the film originally ran for 68 minutes.

The VHS version, released in 1985 in the UK and 1986 in the US was trimmed to 55 minutes by the record company without consulting Yoko Ono. "Mind Train" was completely cut, as was half of "I Don't Wanna Be a Soldier", Yoko's Whisper Piece, which originally came after "Mind Train", and all of "Midsummer New York".

A restored and remastered 70-minute cut of the original version of the film was released in 2018 theatrically, on Blu-ray, DVD and digitally, combined with the 2002 documentary Gimme Some Truth (The Making of Imagine) as part of a massive reissue campaign centered around the Imagine album in 2018.

== Restoration ==
Between 2010 and 2018 the film was painstakingly reassembled from the original negative, regraded and digitally cleaned frame-by-frame in HD1080, with the audio completely remixed from scratch from the original multitracks by Paul Hicks at Abbey Road Studios in Stereo, 7.1 Surround Sound and Dolby Atmos for a theatrical, Blu-ray, DVD and digital release.

== See also ==
- Imagine: John Lennon – a documentary film from 1988
