= Imagine: John Lennon (soundtrack) =

Soundtrack album by John Lennon
- Released: 10 October 1988
- Recorded: 11 February 1963 – October 1980
- Genre: Rock
- Length: 73:46
- Label: Parlophone/EMI (UK); Apple Records; Capitol (US/Venezuela)
- Producer: George Martin, John Lennon, Yoko Ono, Phil Spector, Jack Douglas

John Lennon chronology
Menlove Ave. (1986)	Imagine: John Lennon (1988)	Lennon (1990)

Singles from Imagine: John Lennon
- 1. "Jealous Guy" Released: 3 October 1988; 2. "Real Love" Released: 10 October 1988

Professional ratings
Review scores
Source	Rating
AllMusic	4/5 stars
MusicHound	4/5 stars
Q	3/5 stars

Imagine: John Lennon is a soundtrack album of popular music compiled for the 1988 documentary film Imagine: John Lennon from songs written or co-written by John Lennon. Originally released that year as a double album, it now remains available on one CD.

Bridging his two musical phases together, as a member of the Beatles and a solo artist (similar to George Harrison's earlier The Best of George Harrison), Imagine: John Lennon is a career-spanning collection of Lennon's many musical highlights. In addition there are a couple of heretofore unreleased recordings: an acoustic demo of "Real Love" taped in 1979 (an alternative recording of which would be finished by the Beatles for 1996's Anthology 2) and a rehearsal take of "Imagine" in mid-1971 before the final take was captured. It also features for the first time a clean-intro version of "A Day in the Life", that would appear later on the CD release of the Beatles' 1967–1970 compilation.

Imagine: John Lennon, with its wealth of stock Lennon footage and self-narration, proved to be a well-received film and its soundtrack sold well in the United States, reaching No. 31 and going gold. In the United Kingdom, the album peaked at No. 64.

The project arrived at a timely juncture and was successful in thwarting the then-released The Lives of John Lennon by Albert Goldman, a controversial and reputation-tarnishing book which many dismissed as fiction, including Ono and Lennon's close friends, as well as the surviving Beatles.

== Track listing ==
All songs by John Lennon, except where noted.

Tracks 2–10 produced by George Martin.
Track 11 produced by Lennon and Yoko Ono.
Tracks 12–14, 17 & 21 produced by Lennon, Ono and Phil Spector.
Track 15 produced by Ono.
Track 16 produced by Lennon.
Tracks 18–20 produced by Lennon, Ono and Jack Douglas.

1. "Real Love" – 2:48
  - October 1979 demo recording (the sixth take); a different demo of this song would eventually be used as the foundation of the Beatles' version in 1995
2. "Twist and Shout" (Medley/Russell) – 2:33
  - Originally appeared on the Beatles' 1963 debut album Please Please Me
3. "Help!" (Lennon/Paul McCartney) – 2:18
  - Originally appeared on the Beatles' 1965 album Help!
4. "In My Life" (Lennon–McCartney) – 2:25
  - Originally appeared on the Beatles' 1965 album Rubber Soul
5. "Strawberry Fields Forever" (Lennon–McCartney) – 4:07
  - Originally appeared as a single in 1967 by the Beatles and later released on their 1967 album Magical Mystery Tour
6. "A Day in the Life" (Lennon–McCartney) – 5:06
  - Originally appeared on the Beatles' 1967 album Sgt. Pepper's Lonely Hearts Club Band
7. "Revolution" (Lennon–McCartney) – 3:24
  - Originally appeared as the single B-Side of "Hey Jude" in 1968 by the Beatles
8. "The Ballad of John and Yoko" (Lennon–McCartney) – 2:58
  - Originally appeared as a single in 1969 by the Beatles
9. "Julia" (Lennon–McCartney) – 2:54
  - Originally appeared on the Beatles' 1968 album The Beatles
10. "Don't Let Me Down" (Lennon–McCartney) – 3:34
  - Originally appeared as the single B-Side of "Get Back" in 1969 by the Beatles
11. "Give Peace a Chance" – 4:53
  - Originally released as a single in 1969. It was also originally credited to Lennon–McCartney, but the credit was revised in the 1990s to cite only John Lennon as its composer
12. "How?" – 3:41
  - Originally appeared on the 1971 album Imagine
13. "Imagine (Rehearsal)" – 1:25
  - A 1 minute demonstration of the song to the session musicians
14. "God" – 4:09
  - Originally appeared on the 1970 album John Lennon/Plastic Ono Band
15. "Mother" – 4:45
  - This 1972 live performance of "Mother" originally appeared on the 1986 album Live In New York City
16. "Stand by Me" (Ben E. King, Jerry Leiber, Mike Stoller) – 3:28
  - Originally appeared on the 1975 album Rock 'n' Roll
17. "Jealous Guy" – 4:14
  - Originally appeared on the 1971 album Imagine
18. "Woman" – 3:33
19. "Beautiful Boy (Darling Boy)" – 4:05
20. "(Just Like) Starting Over" – 3:59
  - Tracks 18–20 originally appeared on the 1980 album Double Fantasy
21. "Imagine" – 3:02
  - Originally appeared on the 1971 album of the same name

== Other songs in the film ==
"Be-Bop-A-Lula"
Medley: "Rip It Up"/"Ready Teddy"

- Both originally appeared on the 1975 album Rock 'n' Roll

"Some Other Guy"

- At the time the film was released it was officially unavailable; it appeared later on the Beatles' 1994 album Live at the BBC

"Love Me Do"

- Originally appeared in 1962 as the Beatles' first single

"From Me to You"

- Originally appeared in 1963 as the Beatles' third single

"Lucy in the Sky with Diamonds"

- Originally appeared on the Beatles' 1967 album Sgt. Pepper's Lonely Hearts Club Band

"Oh Yoko!"
"How Do You Sleep?"

- Both originally appeared on the 1971 album Imagine

"Everybody Had a Hard Year"

- An early and officially unreleased version of the song that later was part of the Beatles' song I've Got a Feeling

"I've Got a Feeling"
"Across the Universe"

- Both originally appeared on the Beatles' 1970 album Let It Be

"Come Together"

- This 1972 live performance of "Come Together" originally appeared on the 1986 album Live In New York City

"Hold On"

- Originally appeared on the 1970 album John Lennon/Plastic Ono Band

"All You Need Is Love"

- Originally appeared as a single in 1967 by the Beatles and later released on their 1967 album Magical Mystery Tour

== Certifications ==
Certifications for Imagine: John Lennon
Region	Certification	Certified units/sales
Canada (Music Canada)	Platinum	100,000^{^}
Switzerland (IFPI Switzerland)	Gold	25,000^{^}
United Kingdom (BPI)	Gold	100,000^{^}
United States (RIAA)	Gold	500,000^{^}
^{^} Shipments figures based on certification alone.
