= It's So Hard =

Single by John Lennon

from the album Imagine
- A-side: "Imagine"
- Released: 11 October 1971
- Recorded: 11 February 1971 at Ascot Sound Studios, Ascot and 4 July 1971 Record Plant East, New York
- Genre: Blues
- Length: 2:25
- Label: Apple
- Songwriter: John Lennon
- Producers: Phil Spector, John Lennon and Yoko Ono

John Lennon singles chronology
"Power to the People" (1971)	"It's So Hard" (1971)	"Happy Xmas (War Is Over)" (1971)

"It's So Hard" is a song written and performed by John Lennon, which first appeared on his 1971 album Imagine. Shortly after the album's release, the song was issued as the B-side to the single "Imagine". In Mexico, it was released on an EP with "Imagine", "Oh My Love" and "Gimme Some Truth". In February 1986, a live performance from 30 August 1972 was issued on Lennon's live album Live in New York City.

== Lyrics and music ==
According to author John Blaney, the lyrics of "It's So Hard" represent a summary of Lennon's struggle with life's difficulties. The lyrics describe one of Lennon's attitudes towards life, complaining about difficulties and the need to eat and love, commenting that sometimes things get so difficult he wants to stop trying; he ultimately finds solace with his lover. Author Andrew Grant Jackson interprets the song as demonstrating the difficulty in achieving the utopia-style vision in his song "Imagine", which was released as the A-side of the single including "It's So Hard", due to the drudgery of everyday life. The song incorporates double entendres such as "going down", which is used to mean "giving up" early in the song, but refers to oral sex later in the song. The title phrase serves as a sexual double entendre when used in the portion of the song describing when the singer is with his lover and things are good.

"It's So Hard" is a rocking blues-style tune. Record World described it as "a rocker."

Music critic Wilfrid Mellers considers the vocal line to be based on gospel and soul music, but states that the song's use of sharpened fourths and false relations gives it a "harsh rock-bottom reality comparable with that of genuine, primitive blues". Rolling Stone critic David Fricke describes it as being "like 'Yer Blues' from The Beatles, with an ironed-out beat and hearty blasts of tenor saxophone".

== Recording ==
"It's So Hard" was recorded on 11 February 1971 at Ascot Sound Studios, Ascot and Record Plant East, New York. It was the first song recorded at Ascot, as it was considered a good test for the new studio, being a simple blues song. The Flux Fiddlers' part was overdubbed on 4 July 1971 at the Record Plant.

The primary instruments are Lennon on guitar and piano, Klaus Voormann on bass and Jim Gordon on drums. In addition, the instrumentals include strings played by the Flux Fiddlers and a saxophone solo played by King Curtis. Curtis had played on many jazz and pop recordings of the 1950s and 1960s, including the Coasters' 1958 hit "Yakety Yak". It was one of his final performances, as he was murdered just one month before the US release of Imagine. His sax break for "It's So Hard" was recorded on 5 July 1971.

== Reception ==
Mellers praises the potency of the song's 'barrelhouse piano style' and the compulsiveness generated by the song's ostinato. Music instructors Ben Urish and Ken Bielen describe "It's So Hard" as "enjoyable enough", claiming that it "makes its simple point without belabouring it". John Blaney claims that in inferior hands the song could have been "a maudlin song of self-pity" but Lennon's "bouncy arrangement" and "snappy rhythm/lead guitar" avoids this issue.

Author Robert Rodriguez calls it one of the "edgier tracks" on Imagine that forms the album's "real meat". Music critic Robert Christgau describes it as an "unsung great song". Jackson calls it "a funny rant about life that anyone who hasn't slept enough, before another day at work, can make his or her own", adding that "as banal as it is, no one before had ever kvetched in such a humorous way about how hard it was just to function as a human being."

== Other versions ==
On 14 January 1972, Lennon and Ono Lennon recorded "It's So Hard", backed by Elephant's Memory for an edition of The Mike Douglas Show which aired on 14 February. Activist Jerry Rubin played percussion for this performance. Lennon also played the track during a benefit concert at Madison Square Garden on 30 August 1972.

The version from the album Imagine was included in the documentary Gimme Some Truth: The Making of John Lennon's 'Imagine' Album. It was also included in a version of the film Imagine: John Lennon for a scene where Lennon and Ono attended a party at the New York home of Allen Klein, but the scene was cut from the film.

Chris Goss and Masters of Reality covered "It's So Hard" on their 2004 album Give Us Barabbas.

== Personnel ==
- John Lennon – vocals, electric guitar, piano
- Klaus Voormann – bass
- King Curtis – tenor saxophone
- Jim Gordon – drums, tambourine
- The Flux Fiddlers – strings
