= Imagine: John Lennon =

1988 documentary film by Andrew Solt

- Theatrical release poster
- Directed by: Andrew Solt
- Written by: Andrew Solt; Sam Egan
- Produced by: Andrew Solt; David L. Wolper
- Narrated by: John Lennon
- Cinematography: Néstor Almendros
- Music by: John Lennon; The Beatles
- Distributed by: Warner Bros. Pictures
- Release date: 7 October 1988
- Running time: 106 minutes
- Country: United States
- Budget: $6.5 million

Imagine: John Lennon is a 1988 documentary film directed by Andrew Solt about English musician John Lennon. It was released on 7 October 1988, two days before Lennon's 48th birthday (and nearly eight years after his death).

The film chronicles Lennon's life and musical career as a member of the Beatles and as a solo artist. It features recordings that had not been released prior to the film: an acoustic demo of "Real Love" taped in 1979 (an alternate recording of which would be finished by the Beatles for 1996's Anthology 2) and a rehearsal take of "Imagine" in mid-1971 before the final take was captured. The film was commissioned by Yoko Ono in 1986. None of the three former Beatles, Paul McCartney, George Harrison, or Ringo Starr, agreed to participate in the film, though they reportedly mostly approved of it.

Imagine: John Lennon, with its wealth of archival footage and narration, received generally positive reviews. The film's soundtrack was also successful in the United States, reaching No. 31 on the charts and going gold. Solt and Sam Egan authored a photo book of the same title as a companion to the film.

== Synopsis ==
The film is narrated by John Lennon from over 100 hours of interviews, and also features interviews with his first wife Cynthia Lennon; his second wife Yoko Ono; his sons Julian and Sean Lennon; record producer George Martin; and his and Ono's personal assistant May Pang. Lennon discusses living with his aunt Mimi during his early childhood, as well as his relationship with his mother Julia prior to her death when he was a teenager. He recalls meeting Paul McCartney and forming the Beatles with him, George Harrison, and Ringo Starr; Lennon and his first wife Cynthia recount that his massively successful career with the Beatles inhibited him from helping raise their son Julian.

Lennon's career as a member of the Beatles is chronicled, including his writing of the song "Help!", the controversy that ensued in the United States after Lennon remarked that the Beatles were "more popular than Jesus", and the release of the album Sgt. Pepper's Lonely Hearts Club Band. Lennon recalls meeting Yoko Ono at the Indica Gallery in London, where she was preparing an art exhibit. Some months later, Ono visited Lennon at his home, where they recorded Two Virgins. After divorcing Cynthia, Lennon married Ono, and the two spent their honeymoon advocating for peace with their Bed-ins for Peace campaigns. The documentary shows a heated exchange between Lennon, Ono, and cartoonist Al Capp at a bed-in in Montreal, Canada, with Capp criticizing the cover artwork of Two Virgins and the couple's motivations for the bed-in, as well as insulting Ono.

Following the Beatles' break-up, Lennon and Ono continued their peace activism. The film includes footage of New York Times journalist Gloria Emerson expressing skepticism towards Lennon and Ono's anti-war campaigning, much to Lennon's annoyance. Lennon is shown recording songs for his album Imagine, including "How Do You Sleep?" and "Oh Yoko!", as well as performing live at a concert at Madison Square Garden. Also shown is footage of Lennon interacting with a young drifter who appeared at his estate in Tittenhurst Park in England, asking about the deeper meanings of the lyrics of Beatles songs; Lennon expresses that he writes songs about himself and his life, or simply writes "nonsense songs", and invites the man inside for a meal.

Lennon's "lost weekend", an 18-month period which he spent separated from Ono in Los Angeles and New York City in the company of May Pang, is briefly touched on. The film also notes attempts by the US government to deport Lennon. Lennon discusses the birth of his son Sean, his ensuing hiatus from the music industry, and the subsequent release of the album Double Fantasy. With the murder of Lennon in 1980 in hindsight, Ono, Cynthia, Julian and Sean provide some closing thoughts about him and their relationships with him. The documentary concludes with footage of Lennon performing the song "Imagine" on a white grand piano from the song's music video.

== Production ==
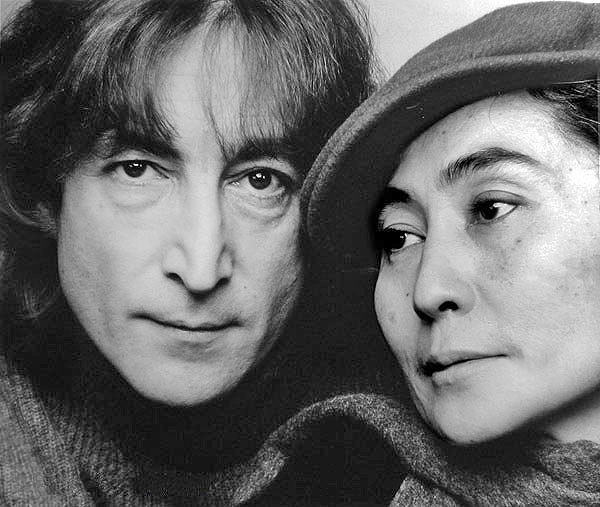
Lennon and Ono in 1980, shortly before his murder

Imagine: John Lennon was commissioned by Yoko Ono in 1986. David L. Wolper was credited as a producer of the film, though he was limited to a mostly advisory role due to heart bypass surgery. Ono was impressed by films Wolper produced about the 1984 Summer Olympics and the centennial conservation-restoration of the Statue of Liberty, and sought him out to produce Imagine, wanting someone "capable of having an objective eye". Ono provided director Andrew Solt and his crew access to film and videotapes from the family's extensive collection. Combined with newsreel footage, the filmmakers had around 230 hours of material to work with.

Comparing the film to the 1988 biography The Lives of John Lennon by author Albert Goldman, a book whose critics (including Ono) have asserted presents an unfairly negative representation of Lennon, Solt stated that "We decided to try to tell John's story in John's words. To basically let John tell his story directly to the audience, so the audience can decide. John was very, very honest about who he was. [The Lives of John Lennon] is such a skewed view of the guy, when [Lennon] really went out of his way to tell us what he was going through. I don't think we were all duped by him for 20-some years, and it was big sham. I don't buy it."

Solt called the film "an open view of John that is basically showing us many different facets of his personality: the angry John, the outspoken John, the critical John, the hurt John, the outrageous John, the egomaniac John, the publicity seeker, the sensitive recluse. If there had been film of John in some of the situations that [The Lives of John Lennon] claims he was in, we would certainly have used it."

== Release ==
Imagine: John Lennon was released on 7 October 1988, weeks after The Lives of John Lennon was published. Ono called the timing of the documentary's release "a beautiful coincidence. In the sense that the truth of what John was like is really revealed in this film, and that it came out at a time when somebody was trying to tarnish John's image and bring out a fictional image of him into the world. The phony image of John might have stuck a bit if there was nothing counteracting it." It was released to VHS video in 1989, and to DVD in 2005.

== Reception ==
Imagine: John Lennon received generally positive reviews. On Rotten Tomatoes, the film has an approval rating of 91% based on 11 reviews, with an average rating of 7.2/10.

Roger Ebert, in his review of the film for the Chicago Sun-Times, gave it three out of four stars and called it "the portrait of a man who was complex, sometimes confused, not always very happy, but a great artist all the same."

Christopher Hicks of Deseret News called Imagine: John Lennon "far from a perfect film, glossing over certain aspects of Lennon's life, and with a narrative structure that jumps around occasionally without transitions [...] however, there is a tremendous power to this film – it has humor, poignancy, tragedy and a sweetness that is hard to resist."

Variety wrote: "Even in a world saturated with images of popculture icons, Imagine: John Lennon stands as a remarkably vital and valuable document of one of the most influential creative spirits of this century."

=== Reactions from the former Beatles ===
According to Solt, though former Beatles Paul McCartney, George Harrison and Ringo Starr did not agree to be interviewed for the film, they all mostly approved of it. Solt stated that "Paul was very positive. You could tell by the way he reacted and was singing along that he was enjoying it. [...] He knew every one of John's solo songs from all those years, and he was singing along with them, too. [...] Harrison had some comments about John having such a strong character. [...] and Ringo was very emotional and very broken up, very affected by the movie." After a screening in which Solt and McCartney were in attendance, McCartney reportedly said "A good lad he was!"

== Accompanying photo book ==
Andrew Solt and Sam Egan authored a photo book of the same title as a companion to the film. The book includes an introduction by Yoko Ono, a preface by David L. Wolper, and an additional introduction by Solt and Egan. In a contemporary review of the book, Lucy Sante wrote that Imagine: John Lennon "is an attractive keepsake, well designed and with some memorable photos, but its text is fannishly vague."

== See also ==
- Imagine (1972 film)
