= The U.S. vs. John Lennon (soundtrack) =

Soundtrack album by John Lennon
- Released: 25 September 2006
- Recorded: 1968–1980
- Genre: Rock
- Length: 75:27
- Label: Parlophone, Capitol, EMI
- Producer: John Lennon, Yoko Ono, Phil Spector, George Martin, David Leaf, Lisa Wohl

John Lennon chronology
| Working Class Hero: The Definitive Lennon (2005) | The U.S. vs. John Lennon (2006) | Gimme Some Truth (2010) |

Professional ratings
Review scores
| Source | Rating |
|---|---|
| AllMusic | 3/5 stars |
| The Music Box | 3.5/5 stars |
| The Rolling Stone Album Guide | 3/5 stars |

The U.S. vs. John Lennon is a soundtrack to the 2006 documentary film The U.S. vs. John Lennon. It was released in September 2006 and it peaked at number 19 on the US Top Soundtracks chart on 14 October that year.

== Track listing ==
All songs by John Lennon, except where noted.

1. "Power to the People" – 3:22
2. "Nobody Told Me" – 3:34
3. "Working Class Hero" – 3:48
4. "I Found Out" – 3:37
5. "Bed Peace" (John Lennon, Yoko Ono) – :13
6. "The Ballad of John and Yoko" (John Lennon, Paul McCartney) – 3:00
7. "Give Peace a Chance" – 4:50
8. "Love" – 3:23
9. "Attica State" (live, recorded at the 1971 John Sinclair Freedom Rally at Crisler Arena in Ann Arbor, Michigan) [previously unreleased]
10. "Happy Xmas (War Is Over)" (Ono, Lennon) – 3:37
11. "I Don't Wanna Be a Soldier" – 6:05
12. "Imagine" (Lennon, Ono) – 3:02
13. "How Do You Sleep?" (instrumental) [previously unreleased]
14. "New York City" – 4:30
15. "John Sinclair" (live, recorded at the 1971 John Sinclair Freedom Rally at Crisler Arena in Ann Arbor, Michigan)
16. "Scared"
17. "God" – 4:09
18. "Here We Go Again"
19. "Gimme Some Truth" – 3:15
20. "Oh My Love" (Lennon, Ono) – 2:44
21. "Instant Karma!" – 3:20

== Release details ==
| Country | Date | Label | Format | Catalog |
|---|---|---|---|---|
| United Kingdom | 25 September 2006 | Parlophone | CD | 3749122 / 0946 3 74912 2 5 |
| United States | 26 September 2006 | Capitol Records | CD | 0946 3 74912 2 5 |
