= Daniel Richter (actor) =

American mime and actor (born 1939)

Daniel Richter (born 1939 in Darien, Connecticut) is an American mime and actor who played Moonwatcher, the leader of a tribe of ape-men in 2001: A Space Odyssey.

At the time of his casting in 2001, Richter was unknown, working mainly as a mime, leading a troupe in London. Kubrick made him largely responsible for choreographing the "Dawn of Man" sequence, believing Richter could take the film away from Hollywood clichés of men in monkey suits. Richter and his troupe spent hours watching apes in the London zoo, particularly the especially popular Guy the Gorilla, followed by hours of rehearsal mimicking their movements. After 2001, Richter appeared in the film The Revolutionary. In 2002, Richter published a book about his experiences entitled Moonwatcher's Memoir: A Diary of 2001: A Space Odyssey.

Richter went on to work and live with John Lennon and Yoko Ono, appearing in their 1972 Imagine video at Tittenhurst Park. His memoir of this time, "The Dream Is Over", was released in 2012. In a 2019 article at the Salon website, Richter told of how in 1969 he supplied heroin to Yoko and John Lennon while the Beatles were working in the studio.

He has climbed over 500 peaks in North America, participating in and sometimes serving as an instructor in the Sierra Club.

Richter is son of New Yorker cartoonist Mischa Richter.

== Filmography ==
- 2001: A Space Odyssey (1968) - Moonwatcher
- The Revolutionary (1970)
