= Mrs. Lennon =

Single by Yoko Ono

from the album Fly
- B-side: "Midsummer New York"
- Released: 29 September 1971
- Genre: Pop
- Length: 4:12
- Label: Apple
- Songwriter: Yoko Ono
- Producers: Yoko Ono, John Lennon

Yoko Ono singles chronology
"Open Your Box" (1971)	"Mrs. Lennon" (1971)	"Mind Train" (1972)

"Mrs. Lennon" is Yoko Ono's first single from her second studio album Fly, released in 1971. It was written and performed by Ono, and produced by Ono and her husband John Lennon. It includes the B-side "Midsummer New York". "Mrs. Lennon" was featured in the 1972 film Imagine.

== Reception ==
Ono biographers Nell Beram and Carolyn Boriss-Krimsky described the song's theme as the way the public defined Ono solely as ex-Beatle John Lennon's wife and did not recognize her as an artist in her own right. Beram and Boriss-Krimsky felt that the lack of promotion her records including Fly received was a reflection of this theme, since her record company did not believe that the public would be interested in Ono's solo work. Ben Urish and Ken Bielen described the song's theme similarly, stating that it is an "ironic ballad" that it sounds like a love song, but the lyrics describe Ono's anxiety about losing her identity.

Cash Box described the song as "a most beautiful ballad," stating that it "adds new dimension to [Ono's] talents as she can now appeal to both AM and underground markets." Record World said it has "a good shot at general acceptance and that Ono "sings it nicely and husband John accompanies on piano." Billboard described "Mrs. Lennon" as an "unusual and unique original ballad" which "could prove a big left field winner".

Zachary Hoskins of Slant Magazine described "Mrs. Lennon" as a "haunting, piano-led ballad." Allmusic critic Ned Raggett called the song "reflective," stating that it provides "as wry but heartfelt a portrait of her position in the public eye as any." Pitchfork critic Mark Masters calls it an attempt by Ono to write a more conventional song than she has in the past and describes it as "glammy balladry." Masters describes her singing as "somber" and notes that she is accompanied by Lennon's "slow piano chords." Urish and Bielen praised Lennon's piano work, describing it as "evocative faux classical piano playing." The Spill Magazine critic Aaron Badgley stated that "Mrs. Lennon" is "proof that Ono can write, and produce standard pop ballads, but even then, she throws in her own curves which makes the song that more interesting and enjoyable." Lennon biographer Geoffrey Giuliano described the song as "haunting." Lennon described it as more of a "straight" track than her previous work, stating that it shows off "her more conservative side."

== Music video ==
A music video for the song premiered on The Dick Cavett Show on 11 September 1971, when John Lennon and Yoko Ono were guests on the programme. (The video is introduced at approximately the 39:24 mark). Film of "Mrs. Lennon" depicting the couple walking around their Ascot mansion was included in the 1972 television film Imagine.

== Legacy and influence ==
Alex Chilton incorporated part of the song's chord progression into his track "Holocaust" on Big Star's Third album.

== Personnel ==
- Yoko Ono – vocals
- John Lennon – piano, organ
- Klaus Voormann – acoustic guitar, bass
