= Erection (film) =

1971 short film by John Lennon

- Frame from the film
- Directed by: John Lennon; Yoko Ono
- Edited by: George Maciunas
- Music by: Yoko Ono
- Production company: Bob Godfrey Films
- Release date: 1971
- Running time: 19 minutes
- Country: United Kingdom
- Language: English

Erection is a 1971 British short film directed by John Lennon and Yoko Ono with music by Ono.

== Synopsis ==
The 19-minute film is a time-lapse video of the construction of the London International Hotel (now the London Marriott Hotel Kensington) at 147 Cromwell Road, Kensington. The film was made of photographs taken from a single point over a number of months in 1970 and 1971; Lennon sought permission to photograph the building's entire construction. The camera was fixed in place by Iain Macmillan, the photographer who captured the 1969 Abbey Road album cover photograph. The footage was edited on 16 mm film by George Maciunas, founder of the Fluxus art movement and avant-garde contemporary of Ono.

The film uses the songs "Airmale" and "You" from Ono's 1971 album Fly, as its soundtrack.

When Lennon and Yoko appeared on the Dick Cavett Show on 11 September 1971, Lennon said that the inspiration for the film was when he would spend periods of time away from any particular city, he would return to find large buildings having been constructed. He also outlines how the film shows a single bush showing the seasons passing.
