= Midsummer New York =

Single by Yoko Ono

from the album Fly
- A-side: "Mrs. Lennon"
- Released: 29 September 1971 (US); 29 October 1971 (UK)
- Genre: Rock and roll
- Length: 3:52
- Label: Apple Records
- Songwriter: Yoko Ono
- Producers: Yoko Ono, John Lennon

"Midsummer New York" is a song written by Yoko Ono that was released as the opening song of her 1971 album Fly and also as the B-side of the single "Mrs. Lennon".

== Lyrics and music ==
"Midsummer New York" is based on the Elvis Presley song "Heartbreak Hotel". Norma Coates explains that the song begins as an "old-fashioned rock song" borrowing the melody and rhythm from "Heartbreak Hotel" as well as elements from the earlier song's accompaniment, but the references to early rock 'n' roll are undermined by Ono's vocal performance and by the lyrics. The lyrics express "female dread, fear and pain". Ben Urish and Ken Bielen interpret the lyrics as reflecting the "physical and psychological effects of a nightmarish panic attack". Coates feels that Ono's projection of these emotions are enhanced by the continual repetition of the word "shake" and "shaking". Ono restricts her vocal range and even when she nearly screams her words, Coates finds her voice to sound "oddly stifled". Musicologist Tamara Levitx has suggested that this stifled vocal sound symbolizes the "suffocation of her female desire and voice" and more broadly women's invisibility within the world of rock 'n' roll even when they perform. Ono biographers Nell Beram and Carolyn Boriss-Krimsky consider the "Heartbeat Hotel" similarity to be a bit of a joke on Ono's part, playing off the fact that Presley's smooth, affected voice was almost the complete opposite of Ono's wild and spontaneous vocal style. Urish and Bielen concur that the song is intended as a parody on Presley's song.

== Reception ==
AllMusic critic Ned Raggett describes "Midsummer New York" as "easygoing rock chug that won't surprise many". Gillian Gaar described it as a "rock 'n' roll parody". Pitchfork Critic Mark Masters described it as "spilling blues supporting Ono’s escalating screams". Beatle biographer Bruce Pollock described it as "a relatively straight-ahead rocker". Urish and Bielen see the song as evidence that Ono was learning rock techniques from husband John Lennon to employ in addition to her more famous avant-garde techniques.

== Other appearances ==
"Midsummer New York" was later included in Ono's compilation albums Onobox and Walking on Thin Ice. It was also used in Ono's musical New York Rock. An alternate version from the Fly recording sessions was released in 2018 as a bonus track on the Japanese Edition of Warzone.

Ono performed "Midsummer New York" on the second day that she and Lennon co-hosted the Mike Douglas Show in 1972. She was accompanied by Elephant's Memory as well by Jerry Rubin and Barbara Loden playing bongo drums. This show was taped on 18 January 1972 and televised on 15 February.

"Midsummer New York" was included on the original version of Lennon and Ono's 1972 television film Imagine but it was one of two Ono songs that was cut from the shortened revised version. "Mind Train", the follow-up single from Fly, was the other song cut.
