= Mischa Richter =

American cartoonist

Mischa Richter

Mischa Richter (1910 – March 23, 2001) was an American cartoonist best known for his numerous cartoons published in The New Yorker over decades.

== Early life ==
Richter was born in Kharkov, Russian Empire, where his father was the city's Commissar of Waterworks. Young Mischa learned drawing from art tutors and went on family vacations to Berdyansk. After his uncle joined the Red Army and was killed in 1917, his parents decided to flee the Revolution. Traveling by train to the Polish border, they went by cart through the forest and then in a rowboat into Poland. Mischa continued his art training while they spent a year waiting for a visa. They arrived in the United States in 1922 when he was 11 years old. Studying at Boston's Museum School, he became friends with Will Barnet. In 1934, Richter graduated from Yale and returned to Boston where he was a WPA muralist.

== Personal life ==
Barnet later introduced Richter to his sister-in-law, the painter Helen Sinclair Annand, and the couple married. In 1958, they moved to Provincetown, Massachusetts. The two made extended trips to France and Italy during the 1950s and 1960s. They remained together until her death in 1992 after battling multiple sclerosis. One son, Tom Richter, died at an early age. Another son, Daniel Richter is an actor and author.

== Cartoons ==
Richter was a contract cartoonist for The New Yorker, and he contributed cartoons to Collier's, The Saturday Evening Post and This Week. He drew his Strictly Richter cartoon panel for King Features Syndicate. For PM and The New York Times, Richter drew political cartoons and spot illustrations. He also illustrated Bugs Baer's humor column, "One Word Led to Another", for King Features. Mischa Richter's political cartoons were often featured in the Communist Party's literary journal "New Masses" in the late 1930s.

== Books ==
In addition to children's books, there were several collections of Richter's cartoons, including This One's on Me! (1945) and The Cartoonist's Muse: A Guide to Generating and Developing Creative Ideas (1992), co-authored with Harald Bakken.

== Awards ==
Richter received the National Cartoonists Society Advertising and Illustration Award for 1979 and their Gag Cartoon Award for 1974.

== Exhibitions ==
Richter had one-man shows of his cartoons and paintings at the Hartford Atheneum, Cincinnati's Miller Gallery, the Chrysler Museum and the Silver Mine Guild of Artists. His work is included in the collections of Mr. and Mrs. Hudson Walker, Jock Whitney, the Rockefeller Science Museum, the Library of Congress and the Billy Ireland Cartoon Library & Museum.

Jane Winter was the curator of Mischa Richter: A Retrospective at the Provincetown Art Association and Museum from July 30 to August 23, 1999.

== Sources ==
- Jenkisson, John. "Former WPA Muralist Succeeds as Cartoonist," New York World-Telegram, April 30, 1945.
