= Fly (Yoko Ono album) =

Studio album by Yoko Ono
- Released: 21 September 1971
- Recorded: 1969–1971
- Studios: Abbey Road, London; Ascot, Berkshire; The Record Plant, New York City
- Genres: Rock; avant-pop; krautrock; experimental
- Length: 94:52
- Label: Apple
- Producers: John Lennon, Yoko Ono

Yoko Ono chronology
Yoko Ono/Plastic Ono Band (1970)	Fly (1971)	Some Time in New York City (1972)

Singles from Fly
- 1. "Mrs. Lennon" Released: 29 September 1971 (US); 29 October 1971 (UK); 2. "Mind Train" Released: 21 January 1972 (UK)

Fly is the second studio album by Japanese musician Yoko Ono, released in 1971. A double album, it was co-produced by Ono and John Lennon. It peaked at No. 199 on the US charts.

The album includes the singles "Mrs. Lennon" and "Mind Train". The track "Airmale" is the soundtrack to Lennon's time-lapse film Erection, while "Fly" is the soundtrack to Lennon and Ono's 1970 film Fly.

== Recording and songs ==
The album was recorded around the same time as Lennon's Imagine.

In an article that Ono wrote for Crawdaddy magazine, she explained that the songs on Fly are divided into two categories:

- Side 1 and 2: "Songs to dance to – Rock and songs with physical beat".
- Side 3 and 4: "Songs to listen to – mind music with mind beat".

Ono described most of the songs on Fly as being "pieces [...] centered around a dialogue between my voice and John's guitar". She commented that Lennon had "brought in musicians that are fine samurais", who he pushed to "fly with me".

=== Side one ===
The first side of the album includes two songs, "Midsummer New York" and "Mind Train".

"Midsummer New York" is about a deep insecurity that Ono felt which she associated with her time in New York City before she met Lennon.

"Mind Train" is the second-longest track on the album, lasting for nearly 17 minutes. Ono described "Mind Train" as an "intricate conversation" between her voice, Lennon's guitar, Jim Keltner's drumming, Klaus Voormann's bass and Chris Osbourne's dobro. A cut-down version of the song was used for the single release in January 1972.

=== Side two ===
"Mind Holes" features Ono singing with Lennon on guitar. The album's inner sleeve included lyrics for this song that do not appear on the song itself.

The track "Don't Worry, Kyoko (Mummy's Only Looking for Her Hand in the Snow)" is dedicated to Ono's daughter Kyoko Cox and was previously released in 1969 as the B-side to the John Lennon-penned "Cold Turkey" by Plastic Ono Band.

"Mrs. Lennon" is the most conventional song on the album, described by Aaron Badgley of The Spill Magazine as a "traditional ballad [song]". The lyrics were written in 1969 and the music was written in 1971. The song was, in Ono's words, meant to be "a joke on me" and an anti-war song. "Mrs. Lennon" features piano played by Lennon.

"Toilet Piece/Unknown" is a 30-second interlude containing the sound of a flushing toilet.

"Hirake" is the re-titled song "Open Your Box". The song was originally released as the B-side to Lennon's single "Power to the People", but was censored in response to a managing director of EMI calling the lyrics "distasteful". The verse "Open your trousers, open your skirt, open your legs and open your thighs", was changed to "open your houses", "...church", "...lakes", and "...eyes". Lennon and Ono did not complain about the change of words, and only "wanted to get the record out", as a spokesman said. The album version on Fly is uncensored.

"O' Wind (Body Is the Scar of Your Mind)" features the use of the tabla by Jim Keltner and Jim Gordon.

=== Side three ===
Side three of the LP features Ono performing with various automated sound machines created by Fluxus musician Joe Jones and pictured in the gatefold. In the liner notes for the album, Ono commented that she was "always fascinated by the idea of making special instruments for special emotions - instruments that lead us to emotions arrived by our own motions rather than by our control". Joe Jones built eight new instruments specially for the Fly album which could "play by themselves with minimum manipulation".

"Airmale" and "You" represent yin and yang, and "Don't Count the Waves" represents the water that connects them. Ono explained that "Airmale" represents the "delicateness of male" while "You" expresses the "aggressiveness of female". At the end of "You", there is the sound of "wind blowing over a sand hill over white dried female bones", which was created using tape feedback.

The song "Airmale" was used in John Lennon's film Erection.

=== Side four ===
Side four consists of the nearly 23-minute long title track and a 30-second track titled "Telephone Piece".

"Fly" mostly consists of Ono's vocals with some guitar by Lennon. It was the first track recorded for the album and Ono intended for it to be used for her film of the same name. The track was recorded in one take in Ono and Lennon's room at the Regency Hotel around Christmas 1970 on a Nagra, shortly after the completion of Ono's debut album Yoko Ono/Plastic Ono Band.

Ono explained the structure of "Fly" as consisting of the following:

- Section one – monologue
- Section two – monologue in "dialogue" form (Lennon played guitar against the playback of Ono's voice in section one. The guitar tape was then reversed and put together with Ono's voice, so that the voice and guitar ran in two opposite directions as "separate monologues".)
- Section three – monologue in a "trialogue" form (Lennon played guitar against the reversed playback tape of section two. His guitar during this process was then reversed and played along with Ono's voice. When the guitar tape was finished, Lennon played the radio against Ono's voice for the remainder of the track.)

Ono described section three as "a guitar solo with voice accompaniment" rather than the other way around.

Each edition of the US, UK and Japanese albums utilized that country's distinctive telephone ring in the track "Telephone Piece" (i.e. each edition of the album used entirely different recordings). The Japanese version also had Ono speaking in Japanese. CD pressings of Fly use the US version, and the other two versions have never been released on compact disc.

=== Out-takes and other material ===
"Will You Touch Me" was first recorded during the Fly sessions. It was later re-recorded for Ono's shelved 1974 album A Story and for 1981's Season of Glass. The original demo version was included on the Rykodisc reissue of Fly in 1997.

== Release and promotion ==
The original release was a complete avant-garde/Fluxus package in a gatefold sleeve that came with a full-size poster and a postcard to order Ono's 1964 book Grapefruit.

Two singles were released from the album. The first single "Mrs. Lennon" was backed with "Midsummer New York" and received a release in the United States in September 1971, followed by a UK release in October. The second single was "Mind Train", which was released only in the United Kingdom and France in January 1972. The single features a substantially cut-down version of the song on the A-side while the B-side was "Listen, the Snow Is Falling", which had previously been released as the B-side of "Happy Xmas (War Is Over)" in the United States a month earlier.

Four songs from the album were part of the Imagine film, these were "Don't Count the Waves", "Mrs. Lennon", "Mind Train" and "Midsummer New York".

Fly peaked at number 199 in the Billboard 200 and stayed on the chart for 2 weeks.

On 1 February 1972, Lennon and Ono Lennon performed "Midsummer New York" backed by Elephant's Memory for an episode of The Mike Douglas Show, which aired on 15 February.

== Reception ==
Professional ratings
Review scores
Source	Rating
AllMusic	4.5/5 stars
Pitchfork	8.7/10
Rolling Stone	(mixed)
Spill Magazine	4.5/5 stars

Tim Ferris of Rolling Stone magazine gave a mixed review of Fly. He described Ono's music as having "considerable potential" and being "serious work" which could be rewarding with "close attention" from the listener. Ferris praised the "top-rate" studio work of the musicians, and highlighted the songs "Mind Holes", "O' Wind" and "Mrs. Lennon", as well as the "fascinating" Joe Jones tracks on side three. However, he summarised by saying "all in all it just doesn't hold up", stating that Ono and Lennon should take a more "dispassionate" attitude towards producing her work, and feeling that no one involved in the making of the album had "asked hard questions about what is first-rate and what is not". Ferris felt that "Don't Worry Kyoko" and "Mind Train", despite being "livened by a strong rock accompaniment", did not show much progression from Ono's first album and he did not rate the "Toilet Piece/Unknown" and "Telephone Piece" tracks highly.

Retrospective reviews of Fly in later years have been more positive. Ned Raggett of AllMusic stated that "Perhaps the best measure of Fly is how Ono ended up inventing Krautrock, or perhaps more seriously bringing the sense of motorik's pulse and slow-building tension to an English-language audience. There weren't many artists of her profile in America getting trancey, heavy-duty songs like "Mindtrain" and the murky ambient howls of "Airmale" out." In a review of the 2017 reissue, Aaron Badgley of Spill Magazine praised the album and called it "complex" and "a work of art", noting that if people took the time to listen to Ono's music they would be surprised at how "brilliant and intelligent" it is. Badgley stated that "Don't Count the Waves" was "30 years ahead of [its] time" and highlighted "Mind Train" as a "brilliant piece that leaves you breathless". Marc Masters of Pitchfork named the 2017 reissue as "Best New Reissue" of the week along with Approximately Infinite Universe.

The album was a significant influence to British power electronics musician William Bennett of Whitehouse fame.

== Track listing ==
All songs written by Yoko Ono.

Side one
No.	Title	Length
1.	"Midsummer New York"	3:50
2.	"Mind Train"	16:52

Side two
No.	Title	Length
3.	"Mind Holes"	2:45
4.	"Don't Worry, Kyoko"	4:55
5.	"Mrs. Lennon"	4:10
6.	"Hirake" (previously released as "Open Your Box")	3:32
7.	"Toilet Piece/Unknown"	0:30
8.	"O'Wind (Body Is the Scar of Your Mind)"	5:22

Side three
No.	Title	Length
9.	"Airmale"	10:40
10.	"Don't Count the Waves"	5:26
11.	"You"	9:00

Side four
No.	Title	Length
12.	"Fly"	22:53
13.	"Telephone Piece"	0:33

1997 reissue bonus tracks
No.	Title	Length
6.	"Between the Takes"	1:58
7.	"Will You Touch Me" (demo)	2:45

2017 reissue bonus tracks (previously released on Onobox)
No.	Title	Length
8.	"The Path"	5:43
9.	"Head Play" (Medley: You/Airmale/Fly)	2:35

For unknown reasons, John Lennon was credited as co-writer of "Mind Train", "Mind Holes", "Toilet Piece/Unknown" and "Telephone Piece" on the disc faces of the 1997 Rykodisc reissue. Lennon has not been credited as co-writer of these tracks on any other release of Fly.

== Personnel ==
- Yoko Ono – vocals, claves on "Airmale" and "Don't Count the Waves"
- John Lennon – guitar, piano on "Mrs. Lennon", organ, automated music machines on "Airmale" and "Don't Count the Waves"
- Klaus Voormann – guitar, bass guitar, bells on "Mrs. Lennon", cymbal on "O'Wind", percussion on "Don't Count the Waves"
- Bobby Keys – claves on "O'Wind"
- Eric Clapton – guitar on "Don't Worry, Kyoko (Mummy's Only Looking for Her Hand in the Snow)"
- Jim Keltner – drums, tabla, percussion
- Ringo Starr – drums on "Don't Worry, Kyoko (Mummy's Only Looking for Her Hand in the Snow)"
- Jim Gordon – drums on "Hirake", tabla on "O'Wind"
- Chris Osborne – dobro on "Midsummer New York" and "Mind Train"
- Joe Jones – automated music machines on "Airmale", "Don't Count the Waves" and "You"
- George Marino – mastering engineer

== Charts ==
Chart (1971)	Peak position
U.S. Billboard 200	199

Chart (2017)	Peak position
U.K. Official Record Store Chart	39

== Release history ==
Country	Date	Format	Label	Catalog	Ref.
United States	21 September 1971	2xLP	Apple Records	SVBB 3380	
United States	21 September 1971	2x8-Track	Apple Records	8VV 3380	
United Kingdom	13 December 1971	2xLP	Apple Records	SAPTU 101/102	
Japan	1971	2xLP	Apple Records	AP-93021B	
United States	10 June 1997	2xCD	Rykodisc	RCD 10415/16	
Japan	23 July 1997	2xCD	Rykodisc	VACK-5371/2	
United Kingdom	18 August 1997	2xCD	Rykodisc	RCD 10415/16	
Japan	24 January 2007	2xCD	Rykodisc, Apple Records	VACK-1309	
United States & Europe	14 July 2017	2xLP	Secretly Canadian, Chimera Music	SC282/CHIM21	
United States & Europe	14 July 2017	2xLP (White)	Secretly Canadian, Chimera Music	SC282/CHIM21	
United States & Europe	14 July 2017	2xCD	Secretly Canadian, Chimera Music	SC282/CHIM21	
Japan	2 August 2017	2xCD	Sony Records International	SICX-84	
Japan	9 August 2017	2xLP (White)	Sony Records International	SIJP-49	
