= Crippled Inside =

Song by John Lennon

from the album Imagine
- Released: 9 September 1971
- Recorded: 26 May 1971
- Genre: Folk rock; country rock; honky tonk
- Length: 3:47
- Label: Apple
- Songwriter: John Lennon
- Producers: John Lennon, Yoko Ono, Phil Spector

Official audio
- "Crippled Inside" (Remastered 2010) on YouTube

"Crippled Inside" is a song by British rock musician John Lennon from his 1971 album Imagine.

== Background ==
Lennon recorded "Crippled Inside" on 26 May 1971 at Ascot Sound Studios, during the sessions for his Imagine album. Robert Christgau believed its "good-time ricky-tick" rhythm lent the song a "folk-rock in disguise" identity.

The melody of the song's bridge is very similar to the 1964 Koerner, Ray & Glover rendition of the traditional song "Black Dog".

== Covers ==
The jam band Widespread Panic covered the song a number of times during their Summer 2007 Tour, with the band contributing a version to the benefit album Instant Karma: The Amnesty International Campaign to Save Darfur.

== Personnel ==
- John Lennon – vocals, electric guitar
- George Harrison – dobro
- Nicky Hopkins – tack piano
- Ted Turner – acoustic guitar
- Rod Linton – acoustic guitar
- John Tout – piano (incorrectly credited as playing "acoustic guitar")
- Klaus Voormann – upright bass
- Steve Brendell – upright bass
- Alan White – drums
