= Arlene Reckson =

American former music executive

Arlene Rae Reckson (born April 1947) is an American former Music Executive. She managed Record Plant Recording Studios East, from 1969 to 1973.

Reckson worked for John Lennon and Yoko Ono as a personal assistant and production coordinator including during the period known as the "Lost Weekend" and is featured on the inside sleeve of the Imagine album (1971). She later became the first female National Director of Artists & Repertoire for the British Label ATV/Pye Records in 1976.

== Early years ==
Reckson was born in Manhattan, New York to first-generation Russian-Jewish immigrants. She lived with her parents and brother on the Lower East Side until moving to the Bronx as a child where she graduated from Taft High School at the age of 17. Following, she pursued a degree from New York's Fashion Institute of Technology and earned a "Special Recommendation" in the Mademoiselle Magazine College Board Guest Editor competition in 1966.

== Career ==
Reckson began her creative career working as a fashion designer for Italian and American brands, including La Piuma, and private labels for Neiman Marcus and Macy's.

=== 1969-1983: music career ===
In 1969, Reckson transitioned to a career in music production taking a nighttime receptionist role at Record Plant Recording Studios East, where she worked until 1973 and ultimately became Studio Manager. Notable credits she obtained include "Imagine", "Happy Xmas (War Is Over)", and The Raspberries.

In 1973, Reckson left Record Plant and worked as Personal Assistant to Lennon and Ono in both Los Angeles and New York City.

Reckson went on to work in the Artists and Repertoire (A&R) division at Polydor Records, and from 1974 to 1977 worked in the American division of the British record company ATV/Pye Records where Reckson was named the first woman National Director of Artists & Repertoire for the British Label's American division. At Pye Records, Reckson compiled multiple British histories of rock compilation LPs. She also arranged the U.S. mastering of Carl Douglas’ hit, "Kung Fu Fighting" in 1974, which was leased the single to 20th Century Records label for the U.S. release.

In the early 1980s, Reckson was Studio Manager at the New York branch of Power Station Studios where notably, her assistant engineer was John Bongiovi. According to an article in The East Hampton Star, Reckson coined the phrase "Punk Rock" which was used after a visit to Power Station from then Rolling Stone rock journalist, Ben Fong Torres in 1973, after meeting Reckson and interviewing music band, The New York Dolls. Torres reportedly asked Reckson, "What do you think of them?" and she answered, "Kind of like punk rock," to which he responded, "Can I use that?"

=== 1993-present: real estate ===
In the 1990s, Reckson launched into a career in residential real estate in The Hamptons, New York where she currently is a Broker with The Corcoran Group.

=== "Imagine" ===
On Sunday, July 4, 1971, Lennon and Ono arrived at Record Plant Studios looking to record a string section overdub of "Imagine." Reckson is credited with "this and that" on the inside sleeve of the Imagine (1971) album. According to the book Imagine John Yoko by Lennon and Ono (2018), Reckson recalled, "When they finished mixing ‘Imagine,’ they invited me to come into the control room — to listen to ‘Imagine’ as an album for the first time — with John and Yoko. There was only a handful of us ... It's my favorite moment of my life."

=== "Happy Xmas (War is Over)" ===
The night before the recording session of The Plastic Ono Band's "Happy Xmas (War is Over)," (1971) Record Plant studio manager, Reckson received a request to bring in a children's choir. Upon the recommendation of reaching out to a church choir in Harlem, the first church she contacted agreed. After requesting a limousine to impress the vicar, she reached an agreement for the choir's participation and picked the kids up in a school bus the following day. Each child's parent signed a release, Reckson provided the entire choir with Happy Meals and Lennon and Ono donated $500 to the church.

Reckson's photo was included in the album's inner sleeve which featured a circle of headshots of those contributing to the album.

=== The Pye History books ===
During her tenure at Pye Records, Reckson produced multiple British histories of rock compilation LPs, including The Pye History Of British Pop Music: Best Of The British Invasion, The Kinks - The Pye History of British Pop Music, The Searchers - The Pye History of British Pop, and Donovan - The Pye History of British Pop Music.

=== "Kung Fu Fighting" ===
Reckson arranged the U.S. mastering of "Kung Fu Fighting" for Pye Records in 1974, which was leased the single to 20th Century Records label for the U.S. release, the first such single for 20th Century Records. The single went on to sell 11 million records worldwide.

== Personal life ==
While working as Personal Assistant to Lennon and Ono, Reckson developed friendships with May Pang and Cynthia Lennon

In 1975, Reckson married and divorced Joel H. Cohen. In 1986, Reckson married and divorced Stuart D. Arkin –– together they have one daughter, Dakota Arkin.

Reckson resides in Amagansett, New York.
