= How? (song) =

Song by John Lennon

from the album Imagine
- Released: 9 September 1971 (US); 8 October 1971 (UK)
- Recorded: 25 May–5 July 1971
- Length: 3:43
- Label: Apple/EMI
- Songwriter: John Lennon
- Producers: John Lennon; Yoko Ono; Phil Spector

"How?" is a song from John Lennon's second solo album Imagine, released in 1971. Lennon recorded "How?" on 25 May 1971 at Ascot Sound Studios, during the sessions for his Imagine album. String overdubs took place on 4 July 1971 at the Record Plant, in New York City.

Far Out critic Tim Coffman rated it as Lennon's 7th greatest deep cut, saying "Following none of the conventional structures of a pop tune, [it] features Lennon leaving questions unanswered to his audience, wondering if he will ever be able to properly love again if he doesn’t understand the concept of love itself." Coffman notes that "the song’s ending provides an optimistic solution to his problems."

== Personnel ==
Personnel per John Blaney.

- John Lennon – vocals, piano
- Nicky Hopkins – piano
- Klaus Voormann – bass guitar
- John Barham – vibraphone
- Andy Davis – acoustic guitar
- Alan White – drums
- The Flux Fiddlers – strings

== Cover versions ==
- The song was covered by the band Stereophonics as a B-side to the single "Handbags and Gladrags".
- The song was covered by English singer Julie Covington on her 1978 eponymous album.
- Ozzy Osbourne released a cover of this song in support of Amnesty International during the same week John Lennon would have become 70. (Note: Heavy metal singer Ozzy Osbourne recorded a cover version of John Lennon's "How?" to benefit Amnesty International. The track was released on October 5, 2010 via iTunes.) He recorded a music video on the streets of New York to promote the single. Osbourne has previously stated that Lennon's song "Imagine" (from the same album as "How?") was an inspiration for Osbourne's own song "Dreamer".
- The song was covered by American singer-songwriter Amy LaVere on her 2014 album Runaway's Diary.
