= The U.S. vs. John Lennon =

- Directed by: David Leaf; John Scheinfeld
- Written by: David Leaf; John Scheinfeld
- Produced by: David Leaf; John Scheinfeld
- Starring: John Lennon
- Cinematography: James Mathers
- Edited by: Peter S. Lynch II
- Music by: John Lennon
- Production company: Authorized Pictures
- Distributed by: Lionsgate
- Release dates: 31 August 2006 (Venice); 15 September 2006 (limited)
- Running time: 99 minutes
- Country: United States
- Language: English
- Box office: $1,408,065

The U.S. vs. John Lennon is a 2006 American documentary film about John Lennon's transformation from member of the Beatles to anti-war activist opposing the reelection of Richard Nixon as president in 1972. The film also details the attempts by the Nixon administration to deport Lennon from the US to end his anti-war and anti-Nixon campaigns. The film makes extensive use of archival footage of Lennon and Yoko Ono, and includes an interview conducted by anti-war reporter Gloria Emerson.

The film had its world premiere at the Venice Film Festival and its North American premiere at the Toronto International Film Festival. It was released in New York City and Los Angeles, California on 15 September 2006, and had a nationwide release on 29 September. A soundtrack composed of John Lennon tracks was released by Capitol Records and EMI on 26 September 2006. The UK release was on December 8, 2006, 26 years to the day after the death of John Lennon. The DVD was released on February 13, 2007 in the United States. The film made its cable television debut in the US on August 18, 2007 on VH1 Classic.

== Synopsis ==
The film explores the political activism that Lennon became strongly involved in with the Beatles, and after the band ended.

John Lennon is established as being a potential political threat to the American government, and therefore much of the film covers the theme of 'silencing' him and other popular figures that became involved in anti-war activism. Throughout the film the audience can see both sides of the situation: the audience sees the protests and events Lennon and Yoko Ono organised, such as the famous "Give Peace a Chance" rally and concepts such as bagism and bed peace.

We also see the increasing fear experienced by the US government and CIA. This build-up of paranoia and fear for control led to the eventual deportation notice sent to John Lennon's house, informing him that 'his temporary stay in the USA was now over'. The film debunks and exposes the somewhat bizarre behaviour of the CIA and police department over John Lennon and other contemporary figures' behaviour, referring also to different modern issues like drug abuse.

The film features a montage of various mediums. There are videos of performances of songs and interviews of Lennon at the time, recordings of Yoko Ono both present and from the late 1960s and 1970s, as well as a basic story structure of retelling the story of John Lennon's attempts to spread a message of peace around the United States and, on a wider scale, the entire Western world during the Vietnam War.

The DVD "Extras" contain a further 54 minutes of interview segments within ten topic sections, the highlight with Yoko Ono reading her letter written in 2000 to the New York State parole board, who at the time were considering the case of Lennon's killer, Mark David Chapman.

== Cast ==
- John Lennon
- Tariq Ali
- Carl Bernstein
- Noam Chomsky
- Walter Cronkite
- Mario Cuomo
- Angela Davis
- John Dean
- David Fenton
- Ron Kovic
- G. Gordon Liddy
- George McGovern
- Elliot Mintz
- Richard Nixon
- Yoko Ono
- Geraldo Rivera
- Bobby Seale
- Tom Smothers
- Jon Wiener
- Leon Wildes
- Gore Vidal

== Reception ==
The US Verses John Lennon received mostly positive reviews from critics. The film holds a 77% rating on Rotten Tomatoes based on ninety-seven reviews. The site's consensus states: "Though it glosses over anything negative about Lennon, this documentary offers a lot of fascinating archival footage, plus its political issues still have relevance for today."

Among the positive reviews was Roger Ebert's review, as he gave this film three out of four stating that he felt that the film was "remarkable" and "it was great to see a lot of this footage of Lennon-- playful, engaged, warm and spontaneous".

== See also ==
- Jon Wiener—historian who waged and won a 25-year battle to prompt FBI to release files on Lennon
