= Oh My Love =

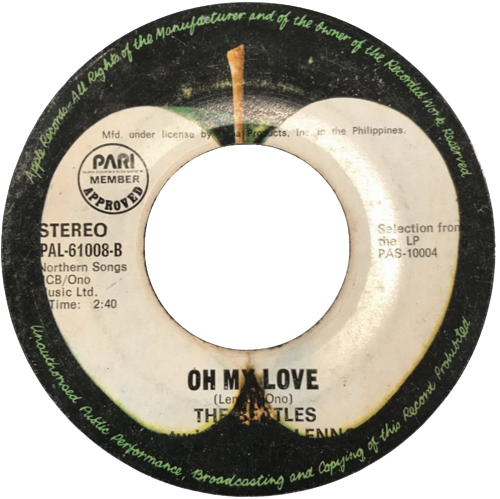
- Philippines B-side label

Song by John Lennon

from the album Imagine
- Released: 9 September 1971
- Recorded: 28 May–5 July 1971
- Genre: Rock; Pop
- Length: 2:44
- Label: Apple/EMI
- Songwriter: John Lennon/Yoko Ono
- Producers: John Lennon, Yoko Ono, and Phil Spector

"Oh My Love" is a song written by John Lennon and Yoko Ono that appeared on Lennon's Imagine album in 1971.

== Information ==
The song was originally written with different lyrics and demoed in 1968 after sessions for the album The Beatles. This demo was released on many Beatles bootleg albums.

Recorded on 28 May 1971 at Ascot Sound Studios, "Oh My Love" was the last song to be recorded for the Imagine LP.

Former Beatle George Harrison contributed guitar on this song and several other songs for the album. His guitar work for the song echoes White Album songs "Julia" and "Happiness Is a Warm Gun".

Ultimate Classic Rock critic Nick DeRiso called "Oh My Love" the most underrated song on Imagine. Ultimate Classic Rock critic Stephen Lewis rated it as Lennon's 4th greatest solo love song. Far Out critic Tim Coffman rated it as Lennon's 9th greatest deep cut, calling it "one of the gentlest songs he would ever write, based around the cosmic feeling of finally understanding the meaning of love."

"Oh My Love" was also released on the Lennon compilation album Wonsaponatime in 1998, and on the album The U.S. vs. John Lennon in 2006. It is track number 7 on Wonsaponatime and track number 20 on The U.S. vs. John Lennon.

== Cover versions ==
The song has been recorded by numerous artists, including Madness, The Bells, Cilla Black, Jackson Browne, Yoshida Brothers, Susheela Raman, Raimundo Fagner, The Jangles, The Wackers, Yellowcard, Morgan Fisher, Martin Gore, Fredo Viola, Jackson Greenhorn and Jacky Terrasson with Cécile McLorin Salvant on Terrasson's 2012 album Gouache. A cover version by The Lettermen became a minor hit, peaking at #58 on the Japanese singles chart in 1972.

== In popular media ==
The song has also been used in the films Little Darlings, Above Us Only Sky, and several times throughout the film Heartbreakers. The song is on the first season soundtrack to the television show Gilmore Girls.

== Personnel ==
- John Lennon – vocals, piano
- George Harrison – electric guitar
- Nicky Hopkins – RMI Electra Piano
- Klaus Voormann – bass
- Alan White – Tibetan cymbals
