= Fly (1970 film) =

1970 film by John Lennon and Yoko Ono

- Title screen
- Directed by: John Lennon; Yoko Ono
- Starring: Virginia Lust
- Edited by: John Lennon; Yoko Ono; Dan Richter; Jon Bloom; Daniel Seymour; Marc Stone; Nancy Kallile; Andy Burke; Bill Holderith
- Music by: John Lennon; Yoko Ono
- Release date: 1970
- Running time: 25 minutes

Fly is a 1970 avant-garde short film directed by John Lennon and Yoko Ono. Filmed a year prior to the release of Ono's 1971 album of the same name, the short depicts a housefly crawling around on the body of a nude woman, actress Virginia Lust. By the end of the film, multiple flies can be seen on Lust's body. The film's visuals are accompanied by "Fly", a composition by Lennon and Ono that would later appear on Ono's album of the same name.

== Production ==
External image
- FLY, 1970. (Film still). ©Yoko Ono via: The Lowry

Fly was conceived as a two-sentence premise initially titled Film No. 11: "About a fly going from the toe to head of a lying naked body, crawling very slowly. The whole film should take about an hour." Future Star Trek producer Rick Berman served as a production assistant on the film and was placed in charge of wrangling flies for the film.

=== Soundtrack ===
The film's soundtrack was conceived in the Regency Hotel in New York on Christmas day in 1970. Lennon recorded the soundtrack on a multitrack Nagra audio recorder in three parts. The first "movement" features vocal improvisations by Ono, and the second features those vocals played back on the recorder while Lennon performs on a guitar. The third part of the soundtrack was recorded as follows: Lennon played guitar against the reversed playback of the second section of the soundtrack; this recording was then reversed (described by scholar Melissa Ragona as "a kind of double negative"), and played alongside another vocal solo by Ono. When the doubly-reversed recording finished, Ono continued performing vocally, and Lennon played a live radio.

The soundtrack would later be released as a track titled "Fly", appearing on Ono's 1971 album of the same name.

== See also ==
- List of films featuring insects
