= Imagine (John Lennon album) =

1971 album by John Lennon

Studio album by John Lennon
- Released: 9 September 1971
- Recorded: 11–12 February, 24 May – 5 July 1971
- Studios: Ascot Sound, Berkshire; Record Plant, New York City; EMI, London
- Genres: Rock; pop
- Length: 39:29
- Label: Apple
- Producers: John Lennon; Yoko Ono; Phil Spector

John Lennon chronology
| John Lennon/Plastic Ono Band (1970) | Imagine (1971) | Some Time in New York City (1972) |

Singles from Imagine
- 1. "Imagine" Released: 11 October 1971 (US)

Imagine is the second solo studio album by the English musician John Lennon, (Note: Credited on the label and inner sleeve to John Lennon and the Plastic Ono Band with the Flux Fiddlers) released on 9 September 1971 by Apple Records. Co-produced by Lennon, his wife Yoko Ono and Phil Spector, the album's elaborate sound contrasts the basic, small-group arrangements of his first album, John Lennon/Plastic Ono Band (1970). The opening title track is widely considered to be his signature song.

Lennon recorded the album from early to mid-1971 at his Ascot Sound Studios, EMI Recording Studios and the Record Plant in New York City, with musicians that included his ex-Beatles bandmate George Harrison, keyboardist Nicky Hopkins, bassist Klaus Voormann and drummers Alan White and Jim Keltner. The lyrics reflect peace, love, politics, Lennon's experience with primal scream therapy and, following a period of high personal tensions, an attack on his former writing partner Paul McCartney in "How Do You Sleep?". Extensive footage from the sessions was recorded for a scrapped documentary; parts were released on the documentary film Imagine: John Lennon (1988). The documentary John & Yoko: Above Us Only Sky, based on that footage, was released in 2018.

Imagine was a critical and commercial success, reaching number one on both the UK Albums Chart and US Billboard 200. Along with John Lennon/Plastic Ono Band, it is considered one of Lennon's finest solo albums. In 2012, it was voted 80th on Rolling Stone magazine's list of the 500 Greatest Albums of All Time. The album has been reissued several times, including in 2018 as The Ultimate Collection, a six-disc box set containing previously unreleased demos, studio outtakes, "evolution documentaries" for each track, and isolated track elements along with surround mixes.

== Background ==
While in New York, former Beatles John Lennon and George Harrison had a short jam session, during which Lennon asked Harrison to perform on Lennon's next album. Recording was scheduled to begin in a week's time at Lennon's Ascot Sound Studios, at his Tittenhurst Park residence. Harrison agreed, and invited their friend, bassist Klaus Voormann.

== Recording and structure ==
Recording for the album started on 24 May at Ascot Sound Studios. The first songs recorded were "It's So Hard" and "I Don't Want to Be a Soldier" in February 1971 at Ascot Sound Studios, during sessions for Lennon's single "Power to the People". A cover of the Olympics' 1958 song "Well (Baby Please Don't Go)", later released on John Lennon Anthology, was recorded on 16 February. Lennon chose to remake "I Don't Want to Be a Soldier" on 24 May 1971, the opening day of the main album sessions.

Lennon enlisted help from Nicky Hopkins, members of the Apple band Badfinger, Alan White and Jim Keltner. Harrison contributed lead guitar parts on various songs. Lennon showed the musicians a song that he had recently written, "Imagine". Also recorded was a demo of the future Lennon track "Aisumasen (I'm Sorry)", the unreleased song "San Francisco Bay Blues", and a demo of "I'm the Greatest".

Lennon and his wife Yoko Ono flew to New York on 3 July to continue sessions for the album the next day, at the Record Plant. Many instrumental parts were re-recorded there, and strings and saxophone by King Curtis were also added. The tracks that were finished at Record Plant were "It's So Hard", "I Don't Want to Be a Soldier" and "How Do You Sleep?" As on Lennon's last album, Phil Spector joined him and Ono as co-producer on Imagine. The string arrangements for the album were written by Torrie Zito.

Extensive footage of the sessions, showing the evolution of some of the songs, was originally filmed and titled Working Class Hero before being shelved. Footage of "Gimme Some Truth" aired as part of the BBC TV show The Old Grey Whistle Test on 12 December 1972. Portions were released as part of the documentary film Imagine: John Lennon.

== Music and lyrics ==
Musically, Rob Sheffield said that Imagine "is an experiment [Lennon] only tried once, making a state-of-the-art professional rock album with a rotating cast of top-notch studio hired guns. But because he's John Lennon, it's also weird and raw." It's also considered by American Songwriter to be the album with which Lennon returned to pop.

Imagine was written and recorded during a period of particularly bad feelings between Lennon and former bandmate Paul McCartney, following the Beatles' break-up the year before and McCartney winning his case in the High Court to have their legal partnership dissolved. Harrison guested on half of Imagine's ten tracks, including "How Do You Sleep?" – a song written in retaliation against McCartney's alleged personal attacks on Lennon and Ono, on his recent Ram album. Lennon said in 1980: "I used my resentment against Paul ... to create a song ... not a terrible vicious horrible vendetta ... I used my resentment and withdrawing from Paul and The Beatles, and the relationship with Paul, to write 'How Do You Sleep?'. I don't really go 'round with those thoughts in my head all the time ..."

The track "Imagine" became Lennon's signature song and was written as a plea for world peace. Years later he acknowledged Ono's role in the song's creation and stated his regret that he had not credited her as a co-writer. "Jealous Guy" has also had enduring popularity; it was originally composed as "Child of Nature" during the songwriting sessions in India in 1968 that led to the Beatles' double album The Beatles. "Oh My Love" and the song "How?" were influenced by his experience with primal therapy.

Lennon also indulged his love of rock and roll with "Crippled Inside" and "It's So Hard". "Gimme Some Truth", first heard during the Let It Be sessions in early 1969, appears on the album with a new bridge. The politically themed "I Don't Want to Be a Soldier" closes the first half of Imagine in a cacophonous manner. The last song on the album was "Oh Yoko!"; EMI pushed for this track to be issued as a single, but Lennon thought it was too "pop".

== Packaging ==
The photographs on the front and back covers were taken by Ono, using a Polaroid camera. It was previously believed that the front cover photo was taken by Andy Warhol. The back cover includes a quote ("Imagine the clouds dripping. Dig a hole in your garden to put them in.") from Ono's book Grapefruit, which UK re-release the Lennons were promoting at the time. The album's original release also included a poster of Lennon at the piano and two postcards. In lieu of sporting the typical full green apple picture on most Apple record labels, a black and white photograph of Lennon's face was presented on Side A instead.

== Release ==
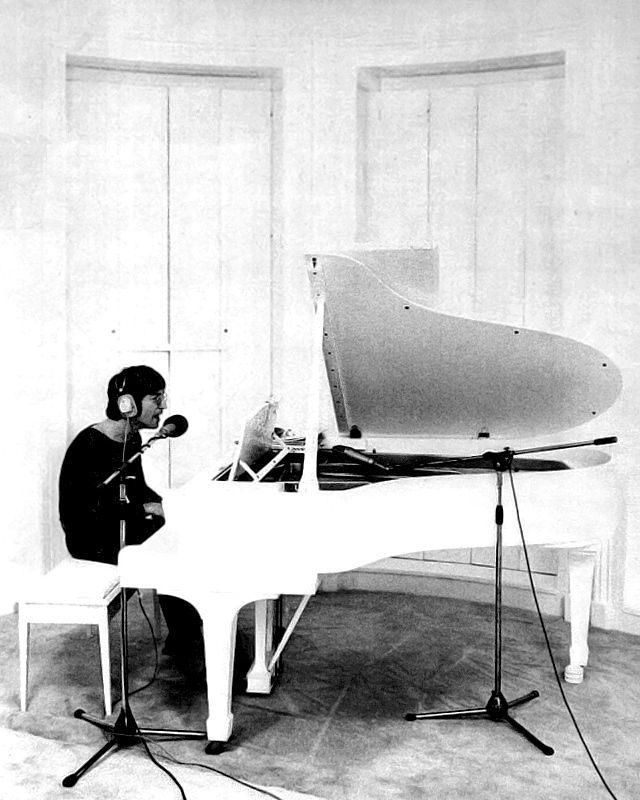
1971 Billboard ad for the album

Apple Records issued Imagine on 9 September 1971 in the United States and a month later, on 8 October, in the UK. Early editions of the LP record included a postcard featuring a photo of Lennon holding a pig, in mockery of McCartney's similar pose with a sheep on the cover of Ram.

Even though Spector championed a "Back to Mono" aesthetic starting in the 1980s, monophonic sound was out of style in the 1970s. Instead, the album was released in stereo and in the then new four channel quadraphonic technology. In the US, the four channel mix was only available on a quad 8-track tape with some copies marketed as "Quadrasonic". In the UK and Australia, the quad mix was issued on LP record using CBS's SQ matrix system along with a quad 8-track version in the UK. In Japan, the quad mix was issued on LP using the QS Regular Matrix system; and also, a discrete quad reel-to-reel tape.

"Imagine", backed with "It's So Hard", was released as a single in the US on 11 October 1971. The album went to number one worldwide and became an enduring seller, with the title track reaching number three in the US. "Imagine" was not issued as a single in the UK until four years later, to coincide with the release of Lennon's Shaved Fish singles collection.

=== Promotional film ===
In 1972, Lennon and Ono released a 70-minute film to accompany the Imagine album which featured footage of them at their Berkshire property at Tittenhurst Park and in New York City. It included many of the tracks from the album and some additional material from Ono's 1971 album Fly. Several celebrities appeared in the film, including Andy Warhol, Fred Astaire, Jack Palance, Dick Cavett and George Harrison. Derided by critics as "the most expensive home movie of all time", it premiered to an American audience on TV on 23 December 1972.

== Critical reception ==
Retrospective professional ratings
Review scores
| Source | Rating |
|---|---|
| AllMusic | 5/5 stars |
| Christgau's Record Guide | A |
| Encyclopedia of Popular Music | 4/5 stars |
| The Great Rock Discography | 9/10 |
| Mojo | 4/5 stars |
| MusicHound Rock | 4/5 |
| Paste | 5/5 stars |
| Q | 4/5 stars |
| The Rolling Stone Album Guide | 4/5 stars |
| Uncut | 4/5 stars |

Reviewing the album for Rolling Stone in 1971, Ben Gerson said it "contains a substantial portion of good music" but considered Lennon's previous LP to be superior. He also warned of the possibility that Lennon's "posturings will soon seem not merely dull but irrelevant". Alan Smith of the NME lauded the album as "superb", "beautiful" and "one step away from the chill of his recent total self-revelation, and yet a giant leap towards commerciality without compromise". He said it was Lennon "showing McCartney how to tighten up the flab in his music, and its worth", and concluded: "Lennon rides high!" In Melody Maker, Roy Hollingworth named Imagine the best album of the year and Lennon's finest work up to that point.

Imagine was voted the fifth best record of 1971 in The Village Voice's Pazz & Jop, an annual poll of American critics nationwide. It was voted "Album of the Year" in polls conducted by Radio Luxembourg and Record World. Robert Christgau, who ranked it fifth in his Pazz & Jop ballot, appraised the album as "primal goes pop – personal and useful" in the 1981 book Christgau's Record Guide: Rock Albums of the Seventies.

Reviewing for Mojo in 2000, Jon Savage said the preponderance of mid-tempo tracks partly explained the album's popularity among Britrock bands, yet this quality made some of the songs drag. He admired Harrison's slide guitar playing in the "sinuous and spacy" soundscape, but found that the album "contains both the best and the worst of [Lennon] – the idealist and the ranter, the righteous and the vindictive anger – and as such remains more patchy than its iconic status might allow". Writing for AllMusic, Stephen Thomas Erlewine finds the lyrics to be "only marginally less confessional" than on Lennon's previous album, adding: "If Imagine doesn't have the thematic sweep of Plastic Ono Band, it is nevertheless a remarkable collection of songs that Lennon would never be able to better again."

In 2003, Imagine ranked at number 76 on Rolling Stone's list of the 500 Greatest Albums of All Time, number 80 in a 2012 revised list, before dropping to number 223 in the 2020 edition of the list.

== Legacy ==
Lennon later expressed his displeasure with the more commercial sound of the album, saying that the title track was "an anti-religious, anti-nationalistic, anti-conventional, anti-capitalistic song, but because it's sugar-coated, it's accepted". In a November 1971 interview for Melody Maker, McCartney spoke positively of Imagine, considering it to be less political than Lennon's previous solo albums. In a subsequent edition of the same publication, Lennon rebuked his former bandmate, saying, "So you think 'Imagine' ain't political? It's 'Working Class Hero' with sugar on it for conservatives like yourself!!" and likened McCartney's politics to those of the staunchly traditional Mary Whitehouse.

== Reissues ==
After Lennon's death, Imagine, along with seven other Lennon albums, was reissued by EMI as part of a box set, which was released in the UK on 15 June 1981. (Note: UK EMI JLB8) Like its title track, Lennon's Imagine became a posthumous hit worldwide after his death in December 1980. The album re-entered the charts during 1981, peaking at number three in Norway, five in the United Kingdom, 34 in Sweden, and 63 in the United States. In 2000, Yoko Ono supervised the remixing of Imagine for its remastered reissue. In February 2000, the remastered and remixed edition reached number 11 on the Japanese chart. It was reissued in 2003 by Mobile Fidelity Sound Lab on gold CD and on 180 gram half-speed mastered LP. The Record Plant piano on which Lennon re-recorded some of the album's keyboard parts was sold at auction in 2007.

In October 2010, another remastered version of the album was released, and the album re-entered the Billboard 200 at number 88. On 23 November 2010, Imagine became available on the Rock Band 3 video game, exploiting the music game's use of a keyboard. On Record Store Day 2011, in honour of the album's 40th anniversary, it was re-released on 180-gram LP with an additional 12" white LP record entitled Imagine Sessions, featuring tracks taken from the John Lennon Anthology. In January 2014, the album was released by Universal Music on the High Fidelity Pure Audio Blu-ray format, featuring PCM, DTS HD and Dolby Tru HD audio tracks, based on the 2010 remaster. (Note: Side one: "Baby Please Don't Go" (Walter Ward), "Imagine", "How Do You Sleep?" Side two: "Jealous Guy", "Oh My Love" (Lennon–Ono), "I Don't Wanna Be a Soldier".)

In 2018, the album was remixed yet again and titled Imagine: The Ultimate Collection. A six-disc box set, in four CDs and two Blu-ray discs, features previously unheard demos, rare studio outtakes, and isolated track elements along with a 5.1 surround mix and the original four channel quadraphonic mix. Reviewing The Ultimate Collection for Rolling Stone, Rob Sheffield gave it five stars out of five, calling the collection "a fresh way to experience this music" and a "full-immersion tour" of Lennon and Ono in 1971.

== Track listing ==
All tracks written by John Lennon, except where noted.

=== Original release ===
Side one
| No. | Title | Writer(s) | Length |
|---|---|---|---|
| 1. | "Imagine" | Lennon, Ono (Note: The original LP credits Lennon as the sole songwriter of "Imagine". In 2017, the National Music Publishers Association revised the credit to include Ono.) | 3:01 |
| 2. | "Crippled Inside" | | 3:47 |
| 3. | "Jealous Guy" | | 4:14 |
| 4. | "It's So Hard" | | 2:25 |
| 5. | "I Don't Wanna Be a Soldier (Note: The title also appears variously as "I Don't Wanna Be a Soldier Mama I Don't Wanna Die" or "I Don't Wanna Be a Soldier Mama".)" | | 6:05 |

Side two
| No. | Title | Writer(s) | Length |
|---|---|---|---|
| 1. | "Gimme Some Truth" | | 3:16 |
| 2. | "Oh My Love" | Lennon, Ono | 2:50 |
| 3. | "How Do You Sleep?" | | 5:36 |
| 4. | "How?" | | 3:43 |
| 5. | "Oh Yoko!" | | 4:20 |
| Total length: | | | 39:29 |

=== Imagine — The Ultimate Collection (2018 Deluxe Edition Box Set) ===
The Singles & Extras
| No. | Title | Writer(s) | Length |
|---|---|---|---|
| 11. | "Power to the People" | | 3:26 |
| 12. | "Well... (Baby Please Don't Go)" | Walter Ward | 4:07 |
| 13. | "God Save Us (Bill Elliot vocal)" | Lennon, Ono | 3:15 |
| 14. | "Do the Oz" | Lennon, Ono | 3:12 |
| 15. | "God Save Oz (John Lennon vocal)" | Lennon, Ono | 3:31 |
| 16. | "Happy Xmas (War Is Over)" | Lennon, Ono | 3:35 |
| Total length: | | | 60:35 |

Disc: 2

Elements Mixes (1–4) / Album Outtakes (5–16) / Singles Outtakes (17–20)
| No. | Title | Length |
|---|---|---|
| 1. | "Imagine (strings only)" |
| 2. | "Jealous Guy (piano, bass & drums)" |
| 3. | "Oh My Love (vocals only)" |
| 4. | "How? (strings only)" |
| 5. | "Imagine (demo)" |
| 6. | "Imagine (take 1)" |
| 7. | "Crippled Inside (take 3)" |
| 8. | "Crippled Inside (take 6 – alt guitar solo)" |
| 9. | "Jealous Guy (take 9)" |
| 10. | "It's So Hard (take 6)" |
| 11. | "I Don't Wanna Be A Soldier Mama I Don't Wanna Die (take 11)" |
| 12. | "Gimme Some Truth (take 4)" |
| 13. | "Oh My Love (take 6)" |
| 14. | "How Do You Sleep? (takes 1 & 2)" |
| 15. | "How? (take 31)" |
| 16. | "Oh Yoko! (Bahamas 1969)" |
| 17. | "Power To The People (take 7)" |
| 18. | "God Save Us (demo)" |
| 19. | "Do The Oz (take 3)" |
| 20. | "Happy Xmas (War Is Over) (alt mix)" |

Disc: 3

Extended Album Tracks and Raw (1–10) / Outtakes Live (11–15)
| No. | Title | Length |
|---|---|---|
| 1. | "Imagine (take 10)" |
| 2. | "Crippled Inside (take 6)" |
| 3. | "Jealous Guy (take 29)" |
| 4. | "It's So Hard (take 11)" |
| 5. | "I Don't Wanna Be A Soldier Mama I Don't Wanna Die" |
| 6. | "Gimme Some Truth (take 4 – extended)" |
| 7. | "Oh My Love (take 20)" |
| 8. | "How Do You Sleep? (take 11 – extended)" |
| 9. | "How? (take 40)" |
| 10. | "Oh Yoko! (take 1 extended)" |
| 11. | "Imagine (take 1)" |
| 12. | "Jealous Guy (take 11)" |
| 13. | "I Don't Wanna Be A Soldier Mama I Don't Wanna Die (take 21)" |
| 14. | "How Do You Sleep? (take 1)" |
| 15. | "How Do You Sleep? (takes 5 & 6)" |

Disc: 4

Evolution (from demo to final mix)
| No. | Title | Length |
|---|---|---|
| 1. | "Imagine" |
| 2. | "Crippled Inside" |
| 3. | "Jealous Guy" |
| 4. | "It's So Hard" |
| 5. | "I Don't Wanna Be A Soldier Mama I Don't Wanna Die" |
| 6. | "Gimme Some Truth" |
| 7. | "Oh My Love" |
| 8. | "How Do You Sleep?" |
| 9. | "How?" |
| 10. | "Oh Yoko!" |

Disc: 5 – Blu-ray audio #1:

Remixed Stereo Album, Singles, Extras, 5.1., Quadrasonic & Outtakes

Blu-ray Disc 1 – Imagine – The Ultimate Mixes

Remixed Stereo Album, Singles, Extras & Outtakes

Blu-ray Disc 2 – In The Studio and Deeper Listening

The Raw Studio Mixes – Extended Album Versions – Live New Mix in 5.1 & Stereo 24–96

== Personnel ==
Personnel per John Blaney. Track numbering refers to CD and digital releases of the album.

=== Musicians ===
- John Lennon – vocals (all), piano (1, 3, 4, 7, 9), electric guitar (2, 4–6, 8, 10), acoustic guitar (3), whistling (3), harmonica (10)
- George Harrison – Dobro (2), slide guitar (5, 6, 8), electric guitar (7)
- Nicky Hopkins – tack piano (2), piano (3, 5, 6, 9, 10), electric piano (7, 8)
- Klaus Voormann – bass guitar (all but 2), double bass (2)
- Alan White – drums (1, 2, 6, 8–10), vibraphone (3, 5), Tibetan cymbals (7)
- Jim Keltner – drums (3, 5)
- Jim Gordon – drums (4, 12)
- Ted Turner – acoustic guitar (2, 8)
- Rod Lynton – acoustic guitar (2, 6, 8, 10)
- Joey Molland, Tom Evans – acoustic guitar (3, 5) (credited as "Joey and Tommy Badfinger")
- Andy Davis – acoustic guitar (6, 8–10)
- Steve Brendell – double bass (2), maracas (5)
- John Tout – piano (2, 8) (incorrectly credited as playing "acoustic guitar")
- King Curtis – saxophone (4, 5)
- Bobby Keys – saxophone (12)
- John Barham – harmonium (3), vibraphone (9)
- Mike Pinder – tambourine (3, 5)
- Phil Spector – harmony vocal (10)
- The Flux Fiddlers (members of the New York Philharmonic) – orchestral strings (1, 3–5, 8, 9)

=== Production ===
- John Lennon – producer, cover artwork
- Yoko Ono – producer, cover photography
- Phil Spector – producer
- Jack Douglas– engineer

== Charts ==
=== Weekly charts ===
| Chart (1971–72) | Peak position |
|---|---|
| Australian Kent Music Report | 1 |
| Canadian RPM Albums Chart | 2 |
| Dutch MegaChart Albums | 1 |
| Finnish Albums Chart | 9 |
| Italian Albums (Musica e dischi) | 1 |
| Japanese Oricon LPs Chart | 1 |
| Norwegian VG-lista Albums | 1 |
| UK Albums Chart | 1 |
| US Billboard Top LPs | 1 |
| West German Media Control Albums | 10 |

=== Monthly charts ===
Monthly chart performance for Imagine
| Chart (1978) | Peak position |
|---|---|
| Soviet Albums (MK) | 4 |

=== Year-end charts ===
| Chart (1971) | Position |
|---|---|
| Dutch Albums Chart | 9 |
| Chart (1972) | Position |
| Australian Albums Chart | 13 |
| Dutch Albums Chart | 30 |
| Japanese Albums Chart | 13 |
| Chart (1981) | Position |
| Dutch Albums Chart | 99 |
| UK Albums Chart | 73 |

== Certifications ==
| Region | Certification | Certified units/sales |
|---|---|---|
| Italy (FIMI) | Gold | 25,000^{‡} |
| United Kingdom (BPI) | Gold | 100,000^{*} |
| United States (RIAA) | 2× Platinum | 2,000,000^{^} |
^{*} Sales figures based on certification alone.^{^} Shipments figures based on certification alone.^{‡} Sales+streaming figures based on certification alone.
