= Oh Yoko! =

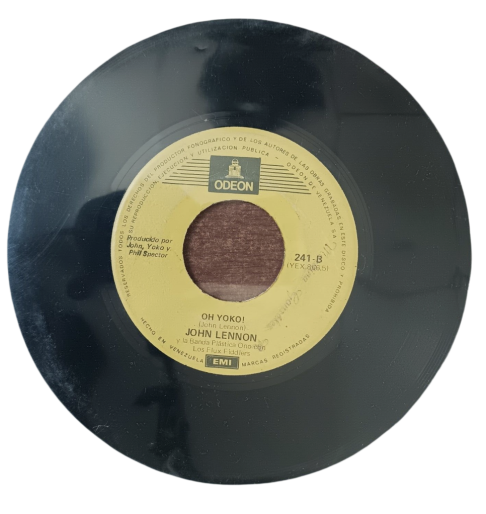
- Label from the Venezuelan single, released in 1971 with "Imagine" as the A-side

Song by John Lennon

from the album Imagine
- Released: 9 September 1971 (US); 8 October 1971 (UK)
- Recorded: 25 May–5 July 1971
- Studio: Ascot Sound, Sunningdale, UK
- Genre: Rock
- Length: 4:20
- Label: Apple/EMI
- Songwriter: John Lennon
- Producers: John Lennon, Yoko Ono, and Phil Spector

"Oh Yoko!" is a 1971 song written and performed by John Lennon. It was first released on his album Imagine, and was later included in the greatest hits compilation Working Class Hero: The Definitive Lennon.

The song was written about his wife Yoko Ono, and features Nicky Hopkins on piano and co-producer Phil Spector on harmony vocal. Lennon plays harmonica for the first time on a solo recording (since the Beatles' "Rocky Raccoon"), and it would also be the last time he used the instrument in a released recording.

== Background and reception ==
Lennon began writing the song in 1968 during the Beatles' visit to India, but was not fully completed until the sessions for Imagine three years later. The melody was inspired by Lonnie Donegan's "Lost John", a song Lennon enjoyed and played often. "Oh Yoko!" was recorded on 25 May 1971 at Ascot Sound Studios. The song has been described as "a carefree ditty expressing love for his wife." Robert Christgau called it "an instant folk song worthy of Rosie & the Originals".

An uncompleted version of the song can be heard and was recorded on tape at the Sheraton Oceanus Hotel in Freeport, Bahamas, on 25 May 1969.

The record label, EMI, wanted to release "Oh Yoko!" as a single but Lennon refused. The only single issued from Imagine was the title track in the United States; none were issued in the United Kingdom.

Stereogum contributors Timothy and Elizabeth Bracy rated it as Lennon's 9th best solo song, saying that "Few romantic ballads hit home as hard as 'Oh Yoko!,' a lilting testimony to enduring passion, every bit as melancholy as it is devotional." Ultimate Classic Rock critic Stephen Lewis rated it as Lennon's 10th greatest solo love song, saying that "A jaunty and swinging tune, with a breathless Nicky Hopkins piano line, the tune beats with a warm, positive optimism."

== In popular culture ==
- In 1973, Japanese artist Keiichi Tanaami made an animated short based on the song.
- The song was featured in the 1998 film Rushmore, starring Bill Murray and Jason Schwartzman.

== Personnel ==
- John Lennon – vocals, electric guitar, harmonica, producer
- Nicky Hopkins – piano
- Klaus Voormann – bass
- Alan White – drums
- Phil Spector – harmony vocal, producer
- Rod Linton – acoustic guitar
- Andy Davis – acoustic guitar
- Yoko Ono – producer
