= How Do You Sleep? (John Lennon song) =

1971 song by John Lennon

Song by John Lennon

from the album Imagine
- Released: 9 September 1971
- Recorded: 26 May, 4–5 July 1971
- Genre: Hard rock; funk
- Length: 5:39
- Label: Apple
- Songwriter: John Lennon
- Producers: John Lennon; Yoko Ono; Phil Spector

Album version
- "How Do You Sleep? (Remastered 2010)" on YouTube

Music video (alternate mix)
- "How Do You Sleep? (Takes 5 & 6, Raw Studio Mix Out-take)" on YouTube

"How Do You Sleep?" is a song by English rock musician John Lennon from his 1971 album Imagine. It is a diatribe against his former Beatles bandmate and songwriting partner Paul McCartney, peppered with barbed accusations that he is creatively "dead" and has a tainted character. Over the years, Lennon claimed sparse and varied motives for writing the song.

The two's relationship had grown bitter after the Beatles split apart in 1970; that year, Lennon gave an interview to Rolling Stone in which he bluntly excoriated McCartney's personality and the Beatles. A year later, McCartney released Ram, a collaborative album with his wife Linda. Some of its songs' verses such as "You took your lucky break and broke it in two" (from "Too Many People") and other bits of the album struck Lennon as veiled insults, and he set out to respond with a song of his own. According to an eyewitness account, Lennon's wife Yoko Ono wrote most of the lyrics; his manager Allen Klein also contributed a line. The recording session on 26 May 1971 saw several musicians in attendance: Klaus Voorman, Alan White, Ted Turner, Rod Linton, Andy Davis, Nicky Hopkins, John Tout, and George Harrison on slide guitar.

When "How Do You Sleep?" was released on Imagine in September, some critics took issue with its coarse vindictiveness. Both Lennon and scholar Michael Frontani have likened the song's purpose and tone to Bob Dylan's "Like a Rolling Stone". McCartney did not appreciate Lennon's suggestion that "the only thing [he'd done] was Yesterday", yet he did not follow with another answer song. By the time of Lennon's death, the two had become friendly again. Lennon described "How Do You Sleep?" as a response to Ram, although he said on multiple occasions that he was never seriously irate at his former partner and that their apparent feud was just "clean fun". He thought it sufficed as a piece of music independent of the attacks on McCartney. On one occasion, he even suggested the song was about himself. Some retrospective writers have commended Harrison's slide guitar work on the record.

== Background ==
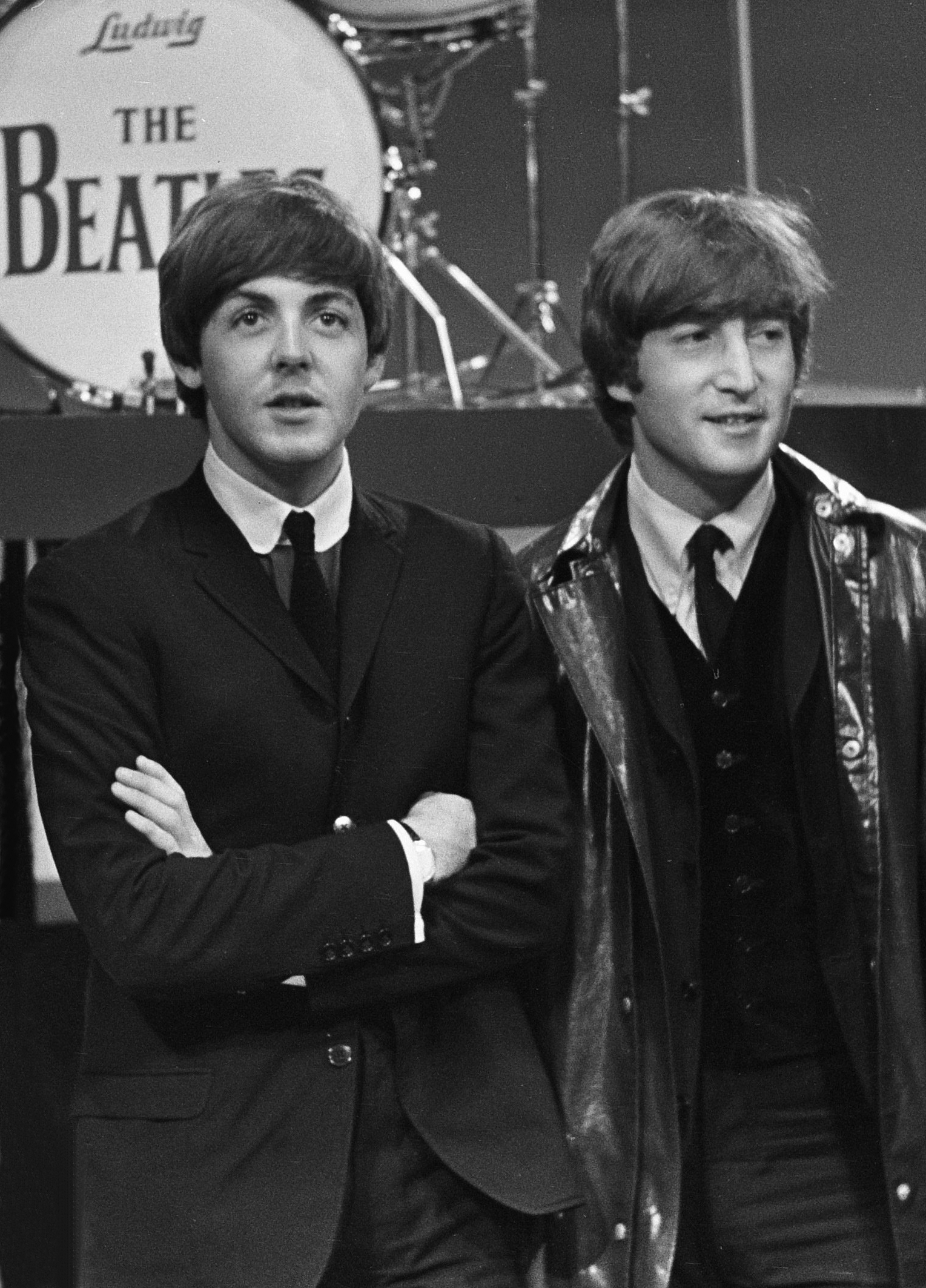
Paul McCartney and John Lennon's (pictured in 1964) relationship deteriorated following the break-up of the Beatles.

After the Beatles broke up, John Lennon and Paul McCartney's relationship soured. The latter released a series of questions-and-answers on 9 April 1970 in which he said he would break from the Beatles for at least some time, and the tabloid Daily Mirror spun the statement into the headline "PAUL IS QUITTING THE BEATLES" the next day. Lennon was livid; he wanted to announce the band's split first. Strains and ruptures also turned up among the rest of the group: George Harrison scolded McCartney in "Wah-Wah" (1970), McCartney forced his bandmates into a lawsuit to formally dissolve the group, and Lennon called the Beatles "the biggest bastards on Earth". For some months, Lennon and McCartney mostly communicated through comments on newspapers or their songs.

According to author Peter Ames Carlin, Lennon's resentment against McCartney spilled out in his contemptful, fiery 1970 interview with Rolling Stone's Jann Wenner; Lennon had recently gone through primal therapy. There, he tore apart the public image of the Beatles and the Lennon–McCartney songwriting partnership, ranting against his Beatles songs, many of the people in the group's orbit, and the band's reluctance to having his wife Yoko Ono in the studio, among other things. He presented McCartney as a conceited control freak and falsely stated that they had stopped writing songs together in 1962. Lennon also called McCartney's self-named 1970 album "rubbish".

McCartney responded by composing "Too Many People"; its lines "Too many people preaching practices" and "You took your lucky break and broke it in two" address his erstwhile bandmate. (Note: On the "preaching practices" comment, McCartney said: "[Lennon had] been doing a lot of preaching, and it got up my nose a little bit. ... I mean, that was a little dig at John and Yoko." And the "lucky break" line was originally "Yoko took your lucky break and broke it in two", but he changed it. Author John Blaney remarks that this song shows McCartney "at his most acerbic", and that he was "attempting to reveal his innermost feelings while at the same time concealing them in metaphors and encrypted symbolism".) Following the song's release on his and his wife Linda's album Ram in May 1971, Lennon felt attacked and found several apparent cases of McCartney insulting him. He interpreted the image of two beetles seemingly copulating—"getting screwed"—on the album cover and the record's opening words, "Piss off", as references to the two's relationship. He thought other Ram songs such as "3 Legs" boasted similar jabs, but McCartney denied this. In a 1984 interview, McCartney said that nothing on Ram targeted Ono and Lennon save for the "preaching practices" and "lucky break" lines on "Too Many People"; the "piss off" comment, he later remarked, was just a small, "harmless" dig. In Linda's words: "They thought the whole album was about them. And then they got very upset." Moreover, some saw a full-page advertisement the McCartneys put out in the music press as a mockery of Lennon and Ono; it showed them wrapped in a sheet for Halloween, Paul wearing a clown mask and Linda sporting a Wimpy mask—a possible reference to Lennon and Ono's perforance art bagism.

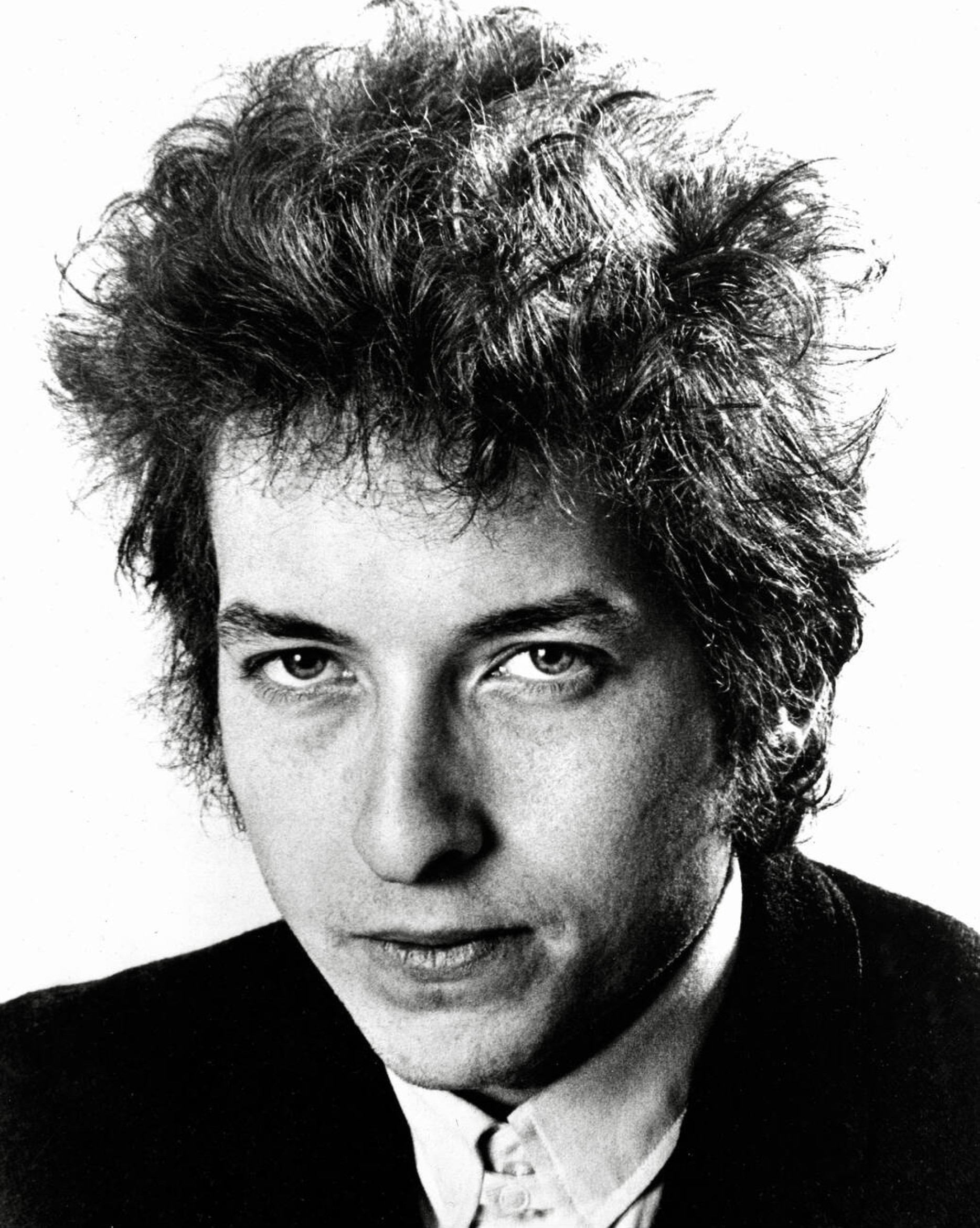
Lennon compared the song's outpouring of resentment on his bandmate to Bob Dylan's (pictured in 1965) song "Like a Rolling Stone".

Lennon addressed the attacks with "How Do You Sleep?". It was written in the aftermath of McCartney's lawsuit in the London High Court ending the Beatles as a legal partnership, itself wrought on by the appointment of Allen Klein as the band's financial manager against McCartney's wishes and the four bandmates' resistance to work together anymore. In his affidavit, Lennon claimed he did not grasp why he would want to end the band, even though, notes writer Charles Ingham, Lennon demanded the breakup in the first place. He also included a photo of himself grappling with a pig in the Imagine album packaging to mock Ram's sleeve and the McCartneys' life in the country.

In spite of all this, Lennon once claimed to have conceived the line "So Sgt. Pepper took you by surprise" in 1969, long before the feud, and explained that there had always been musical differences between him and McCartney. Shortly before his death, Lennon told Playboy magazine:

Well, it was like Dylan doing 'Like a Rolling Stone,' one of his nasty songs. It's using somebody as an object to create something. I wasn't really feeling that vicious at the time, but I was using my resentment towards Paul to create a song. Let's put it that way. It was just a mood.

Around the same period, he admitted: "I don't really go round with those thoughts in my head all the time." In his view, McCartney's subtle insults on his album were hidden enough to be missed by the public, but he spot them nonetheless and thought: "Well, hang up being obscure! I'll just get right down to the nitty-gritty." He echoes this feeling in another statement: "Too many people going where? Missed our lucky what? What was our first mistake? ... I mean, Yoko, me, and other friends can't all be hearing things. ... [How Do You Sleep?] is what you might call an 'angry letter,' sung—get it?" On the other hand, Lennon explained in the 1972 film Imagine that the song was about himself and laments that its meaning had become tied with McCartney. (Note: Writer Paul Du Noyer considers Lennon's interpretations of "How Do You Sleep?" and suspects that it "was one more instance of John’s tendency to shoot first and ask questions later".)

Lennon's December 1970 record, John Lennon/Plastic Ono Band, is frankly and openly acidic. It shores up his anger at institutions and other feelings until then held beneath the reins of his fame and adulthood, and releases them in a set of plain-sounding songs. For his next album, he strayed from this attitude, which he thought was "too real" for most. It would convey the same message but sweeten it, sugarcoat it. For instance, he said of the title track "Imagine": "Now I understand what you have to do. Put your political message across with a little honey", and it is the gentle, warm arrangements and melodies that Beatles historian Peter Doggett credits with making the album "easy on the ear". However, biographer Philip Norman notes that unlike the other Imagine tracks, "How Do You Sleep?" does not line its message with softness or a lighthearted, frisky style; for his screed against foul politicians and President Nixon, by contrast, Lennon chose an "almost Broadway show-tune style". Thomas MacFarlane writes in Lennon and McCartney: Painting with Sound: "The space created for 'How Do You Sleep?' seems to be a photo negative of the one created for Imagine. ... Here, it seems as if a storm is brewing, and its awesome power will not be denied."

== Recording ==
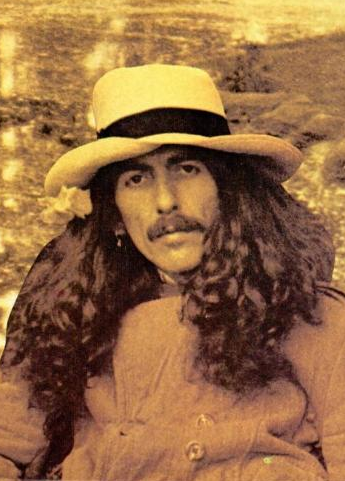
George Harrison (pictured in 1971) played slide guitar on the record.

"How Do You Sleep?" was recorded on 26 May 1971 at Ascot Sound Studios, during the sessions for Lennon's album Imagine. Aside from Lennon on rhythm guitar and vocals, the track includes Klaus Voormann on bass, Alan White on drums, Ted Turner, Rod Linton, and Andy Davis all on acoustic guitar, piano parts by Nicky Hopkins and John Tout, and Harrison on slide guitar.

Although he had been united with Lennon, Ringo Starr, and Klein against McCartney in the High Court lawsuit, Harrison recalled that the Beatles all shared "very strange, intense feelings" at the time, and he was initially wary of Lennon's invitation to play on the new album. Given this, Harrison added, he was relieved that Lennon was "openly pleased I came". Although Lennon received the sole writing credit for "How Do You Sleep?", Oz magazine's Felix Dennis, who attended the session, indicates that Ono contributed lyrics. He reported seeing Ono pen most of the words on a sheet of paper and then excitedly show it to her husband; and with time, the attacks on McCartney escalated. Starr visited the studio during the recording session and grew more and more upset until he said: "That's enough, John." In Dennis's telling, the other musicians were also bothered and told Lennon to tame his rage, yet he remained indifferent. Another firsthand account from photographer Kieron Murphy says they did not discuss the song: "[Lennon] was literally making the album up as he went along, and he was teaching it, playing it for them."

The first takes of "How Do You Sleep?" lasted eight minutes or longer. At this stage, Doggett describes the song's arrangement as shifting from a Eric Clapton-like blues style to a reprise of Lennon's "Well Well Well" to reggae, and then they "found the perfect tempo". A run-through of the track in the 2000 film Gimme Some Truth includes what authors Chip Madinger and Mark Easter describe as a question to McCartney, as Lennon faces the camera and sings: "How do you sleep, ya cunt?" On 4 and 5 July, a group of musicians Lennon called the Flux Fiddlers overdubbed strings onto the recording at the Record Plant, New York City. (Note: The Flux Fiddlers is the name by which members of the New York Philharmonic string section was credited on Imagine.) The song was produced by Lennon, Ono, and Phil Spector.

== Composition ==
=== Lyrics ===
McCartney biographer Peter Ames Carlin deems the lyrics "as brutal as they [are] precise". "How Do You Sleep?" begins with the line "So Sgt. Pepper took you by surprise", referring to the Beatles' 1967 album. Preceding this are ambient sounds evoking those heard at the opening of Sgt. Pepper's Lonely Hearts Club Band. Lennon hints at the "Paul is dead" legend in the lyric "Those freaks was right when they said you was dead"; in the 1980 Playboy interview, he explained that, at the time, he thought McCartney had "died creatively in a way". Next, Lennon accuses him of surrounding himself with sycophantic "straights". He suggests that McCartney "jump[s]" just as his "momma"—his wife Linda—speaks, a suggestion which Urish and Bielen contrast against the way Lennon treated public comments on his relationship with Ono.

The verse "The only thing you done was Yesterday / And since you've gone you're just another day" alludes to the McCartney-penned Beatles song "Yesterday" and McCartney's February 1971 single "Another Day". Lennon first wrote "You probably pinched that bitch anyway" instead of the "another day" line—a reference to McCartney's claims that he was not sure whether he plagiarized "Yesterday", having asked Lennon, Harrison, George Martin, and others if they had heard its melody before. He later removed it; Klein, Lennon's manager, pushed for the lyric's replacement out of fear that McCartney would wage a lawsuit for libel. It is then that Klein proposed the "another day" line. Lennon's remark on his bandmate's "pretty face" conjures up the latter's reputation as "the cute Beatle". Another of his insults on the record is "The sound you make is Muzak to my ears"; his labelling McCartney's music as trite, writes scholar Michael Frontani, aligns with what critics of the time general thought. At the song's close, he ponders how McCartney's work gives no sign that he has "learned something", in spite of his long partnership with Lennon. Beatles historian Robert Rodriguez remarks that "How Do You Sleep?" "reek[s] of disdain" from start to end.

Urish and Bielen introduce the song as a plain tirade against Lennon's once songwriting partner; Rolling Stone dubs it his "evisceration of Paul McCartney". Seeing that Lennon had recorded a tender, vulnerable gushing of guilt in "Jealous Guy" just before, Doggett considers his moving onto "How Do You Sleep?" as "the final proof of [his] mercurial nature". Doggett describes the piece thus:

[Lennon's] vicious assault on his ex-songwriting partner, which accused, judged and convicted him on counts of dishonesty, lack of talent, hypocrisy and—most heinous of all, it seemed—living with 'straights' ...

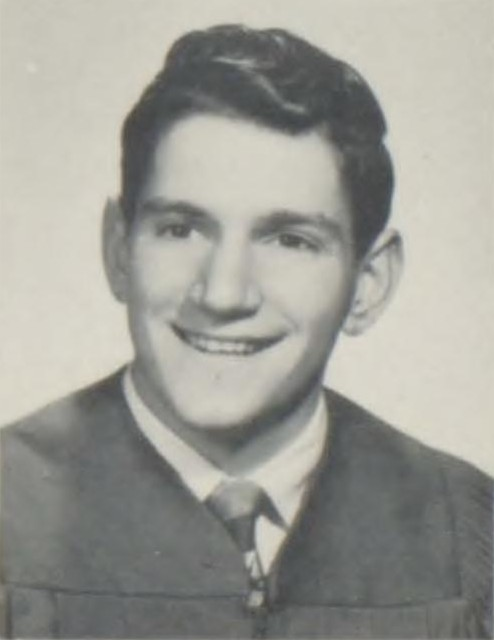
Lennon's manager Allen Klein (pictured in 1950) contributed a line to the song; Lennon later wrote a veiled tirade against him, "Steel and Glass".

Frontani compares the attacks and character assassination in "How Do You Sleep?" to Bob Dylan's mid-1960s songs "Like a Rolling Stone" and "Positively 4th Street". However, he draws a line between the hazy identity of Dylan's victims and Lennon's fortright approach. Despite its reputation, Lennon wished for the song to be judged on its own merits and not just as an address to McCartney.

Lennon would return to the idea of masked character attack in a track from Walls and Bridges (1974), "Steel and Glass", which he described as "a son" of "How Do You Sleep?". It is said to refer to Klein; by 1974, he, Harrison, and Starr had split from him. For instance, encyclopedist Bill Harry suggests, the image of steel and glass points at the forty-one-storey-high building of Klein's records company in Broadway and the line "Your mother left you when you were small" silhouettes his mother's death from cancer, but Lennon insisted that the song did not target any one person and once said it was about himself. Critics such as Doggett and Harry suspect that Lennon was just too shy or otherwise reluctant to speak his real motives. In a Rolling Stone piece, Ben Gerson argued that "Steel and Glass"'s "melody, arrangement and psychological motive" are nearly the same as those in "How Do You Sleep?". Besides the song's tone and build, Urish and Bielen considers the arrangement of "strident strings stretching over choppy horns" kindred to Harrison's slide guitar part on the Imagine track.

=== Music ===
George Harrison's guitar solo
Robert Rodriguez quotes Lennon as saying: "That's the best he's ever fucking played in his life! He'd go on forever [trying to refine it] if you'd let him."

Carlin writes that "How Do You Sleep?" follows a "slow, swampy" rhythm. Meanwhile, Urish and Bielen comment on the instrumentation: "Swelling strings and a bubbling electric piano give the track a festering energy." In their view, not enough people have heeded the effects of Harrison's "aggressive" slide guitar and how it adds fire to Lennon's anger; after this remark, they conclude that Lennon was not alone in raging against McCartney. Frontani likewise declares Harrison's guitar part some of his finest work on a record. He also says the sound of strings tuning up attacks McCartney's artistic pretensions, particularly as shown at the start of Sgt. Pepper's. Similarly, Doggett thinks Spector's arrangement of strings, "the most vicious string sound every caught on record", inflame the lyrics' vituperation as they "[soar] over the guitar boogie riffs before screeching to halt at the end of each chorus like a knife across glass".

== Release and critical reception ==
"How Do You Sleep?" was released on Imagine on 9 September 1971 through Apple Records. As with all the album's numbers, several outtakes of the song became available on bootleg albums and in documentary films about Lennon. It appears on the box sets Lennon (1990) and John Lennon Anthology (1998). In 2006, an alternate mixing of the track with Lennon's vocals purged featured on the soundtrack for The U.S. vs. John Lennon. Urish and Bielen find this version largely repetitive, although they appreciate its lending more space and prominence to Harrison's slide guitar. Twelve years later, a newly mixed version was released on Imagine: The Ultimate Collection alongside other stripped down versions of tracks with "no reverb ... or echo, no effects, no strings". "How Do You Sleep?" features as downloadable content on the 2010 video game Rock Band 3.

Harry and Rodriguez remark that the song's vengeful nature met overwhelming censure from critics and the public. In a contemporary review of Imagine, Ben Gerson spotlit "How Do You Sleep?" among the album's three "really worthy, musically effective numbers" but found its "[laying] waste to Paul's character, family and career" ghastly and unjustifiable. He concluded: "The motives for 'Sleep' are baffling. Partly it is the traditional bohemian contempt for the bourgeois; partly it is the souring of John's long-standing competitive relationship with Paul." Creem's writer Dave Marsh also denounced Lennon's attitude. While he thinks "How Do You Sleep?" comes across as humourous at first, it turns vengeful and self-righteous after "the joke's novelty" erodes: "[Lennon's] face is not altogether clean in the whole affair", he remarks. Writing in the NME, Alan Smith said of the track: "Musically, it's tremendous—open, big, powerful, thundering, dramatic—but this is a song which will be remembered for its lyrics." In Melody Maker, Roy Hollingworth called Imagine the best work Lennon had ever done and described "How Do You Sleep?" as "the unnerving slash at McCartney ... a slow funk with Commanche [sic] or maybe Sioux flavoured strings".

Stephen Thomas Erlewine from AllMusic dubs it one of the album's hard rock tracks, instead. Reviewing Imagine for Mojo in 2000, Jon Savage described the song as "a great performance with a highly unattractive lyric, which roots the record—for all its idealism—in the sour dregs of the post-Beatles hangover". Rodriguez argues that it "debased its creator more than its intended target", leading to "McCartney [eventually coming] out the bigger man". In a 2016 list, the BBC ranked "How Do You Sleep?" the fourth "most vicious" song targeting a real person; it comments that Lennon had already written an attack song against the Maharishi Mahesh Yogi: "Sexy Sadie" (1968). The A.V. Club has identified the song as a diss track.

== Aftermath ==
Where [McCartney's] attack had been mild and sidelong, John's was violent and full-on, a nuclear missile answering a pinprick.

— Lennon biographer Philip Norman, 2008

When Lennon learned that his bandmate had asked how their quarrel was thrust so far to the public's attention, he responded: "Oh hell's bells ... listen to Ram, folks! ... I'm answering Ram. ... It was like a joke, 'Let's write this down.' We [in the studio] didn't take it that seriously." And in response to McCartney firmly recommending in a November Melody Maker interview that the rest of the Beatles settle the lawsuit, Lennon published a vexed letter in the magazine; Ingham deems it "no less scurrilous than How Do You Sleep [sic]". Three months after Imagine was released, however, he added:

There's really no feud between me and Paul. It's all good, clean fun. No doubt there will be an answer to 'Sleep' on his next album, but I don't feel that way about him at all. It works as a complete song with no relation to Paul. It works as a piece of music. ... There was always a musical difference between me and Paul—it didn't just happen last year. But we've always had a lot in common, and we still do. The thing that made The Beatles what they were was the fact that I could do my rock 'n' roll and Paul could do the pretty stuff ... But hardly a week goes by when I don't see and/or hear from one of them.

While saying in the Melody Maker interview that "How Do You Sleep?" was "silly ... [He] says the only thing I did was 'Yesterday', and he knows that's wrong", McCartney admitted to liking Imagine. He showed nonchalance at Lennon's tirade; for instance, he responded to the "straights" jab thus: "So what if I live with straights? I like straights. I have straight babies." In his 2025 book on Wings, McCartney remembered that after hearing "How Do You Sleep?", he almost wrote a song called "Quite Well, Thank You". He discarded it since he did not care for writing an answer song. Following their issuing songs against each other throughout the year and Lennon's Rolling Stone interview, McCartney released "Dear Friend" as a way to reconcile with Lennon; he had composed it months earlier while working on Ram. (Note: As Beatles chronicler Robert Rodriguez notes, "Dear Friend" was not a response to "How Do You Sleep?" alone, as it was conceived before the latter even came out.) He explained in a 1994 interview:

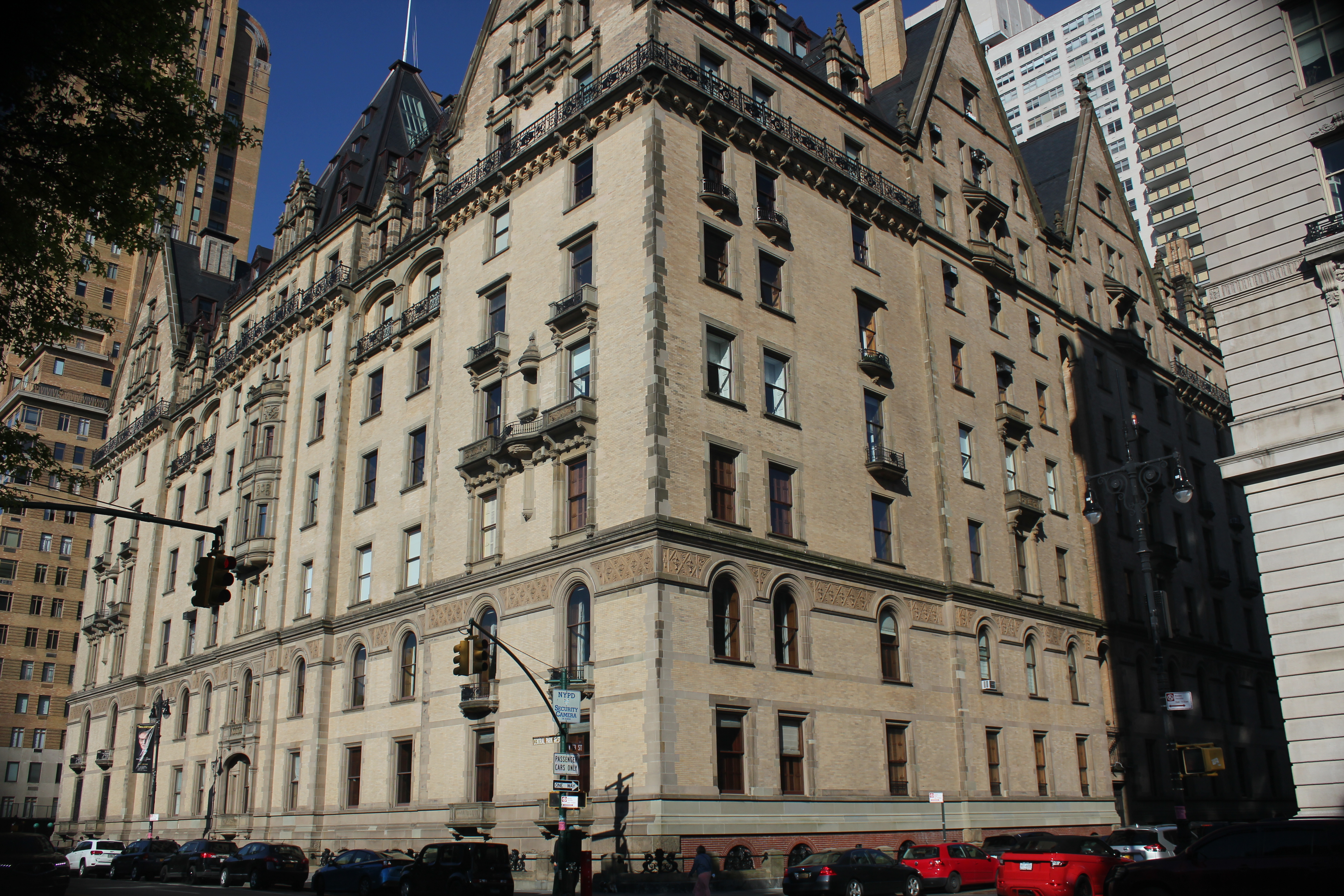
McCartney and Lennon last met in 1976 at the latter's residence in New York City, the Dakota (pictured in 2022).

After John had slagged me off in public, I had to think of a response, and it was either going to [reciprocate]—and some instinct stopped me, which I'm really glad about—or do something else. So, I worked on my attitude and wrote "Dear Friend", saying, in effect, let's lay the guns down, let's hang up our boxing gloves.

It was released on his new band Wings' first album Wild Life in December 1971. (Note: On another occasion, McCartney said it was written to quell their differences fomented by the Beatles' business affairs. Chip Madinger and Mark Easter also argue that "Dear Friend" is, to an extent, an answer song to George Harrison's 1970 song "Isn't It a Pity".) However, Doggett asserts that McCartney did not stay true to the resigned spirit expressed in "Dear Friend" since he kept dwelling on their business problems and "talking about money", in the words of his assistant Shelley Turner. McCartney imagined that Lennon once heard "Dear Friend", although they never personally discussed the song. The two closed off 1971 with the aforementioned pieces in Melody Maker. The next year, they dined together in New York and agreed to stop ranting against one another in the media. This event marked, in Ingham's and Rodriguez's opinion, the beginning of their rebuilt relationship. Two years later, they played "Lucille", "Stand by Me", and "Chain Gang" together in a studio-like space alongside Stevie Wonder and some other musicians. They met for the last time in 1976, when McCartney invited himself to Lennon's abode in the Dakota donning a guitar. Lennon told him: "It's not 1956 and turning up at the door isn't the same anymore", and McCartney became upset. But by the end of 1980, cordial relations had again been restored between the pair. Lennon said in an interview three days before his death: "Throughout my career, I've selected to work with ... only two people: Paul McCartney and Yoko Ono ... That ain't bad picking."

== Personnel ==
Per John Blaney, except where stated:

- John Lennon – vocals, guitar
- George Harrison – slide guitar
- Nicky Hopkins – electric piano
- John Tout – piano
- Ted Turner – acoustic guitar
- Rod Linton – acoustic guitar
- Andy Davis – acoustic guitar
- Klaus Voormann – bass
- Alan White – drums
- The Flux Fiddlers – strings
