= Tittenhurst Park =

Former home of John Lennon and Ringo Starr

Coordinates: 51.40645°N 0.63452°W

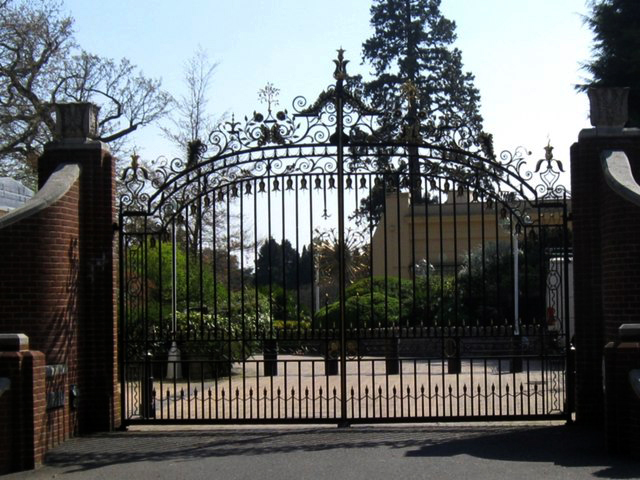
- Interactive map of the Tittenhurst Park area

General information
- Architectural style: Georgian country house
- Location: Sunningdale, Berkshire, England, London Road, Ascot, SL5 0PN

Tittenhurst Park is a Grade II listed early Georgian country house in Sunningdale, Berkshire, England. It was famously the home of the musicians John Lennon and Yoko Ono from 1969 until 1971, and then the home of Ringo Starr and his family from 1973 until 1988. Starr sold the property to Sheikh Zayed bin Sultan Al Nahyan, the president of the United Arab Emirates, in 1989.

== Early history ==
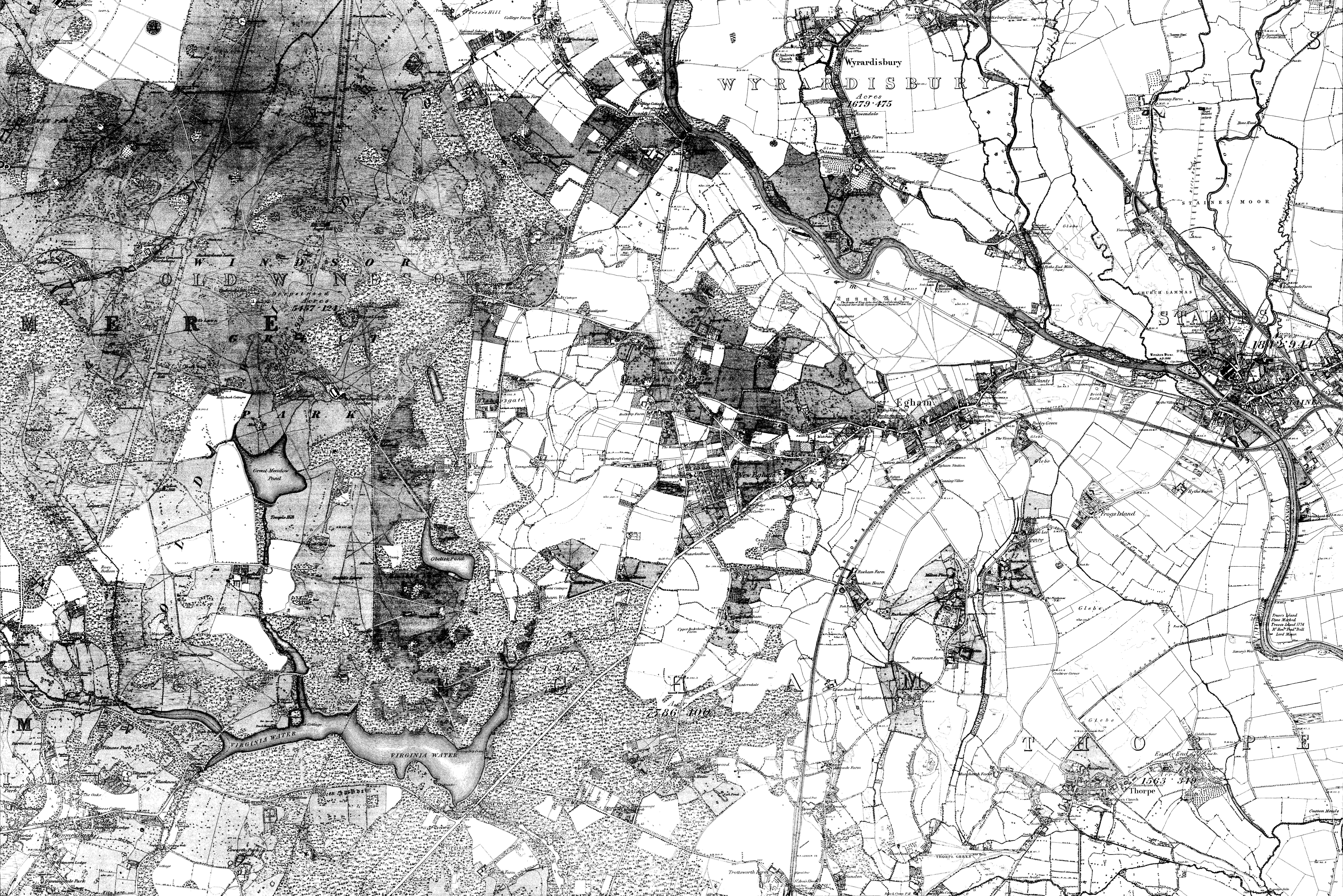
Known as Tittenhurst Lodge in about 1876 (south of the central road).

The present house dates back to 1737, although its fronts are largely c. 1830.

In 1869 the property was owned by Thomas Holloway, philanthropist and founder of two large institutions which he built nearby: Holloway Sanatorium in Virginia Water, Surrey, and Royal Holloway College, now known as Royal Holloway, University of London in Englefield Green. Around 1898 the house was purchased by Thomas Hermann Lowinsky, the former general manager of the Hyderabad (Deccan) Co coal mines in India. He was an active member of the Royal Horticultural Society and won their gold medal for his rhododendrons, an outstanding collection of which he built up at Tittenhurst, including one he named 'Mrs Tom Lowinsky'. Amongst Lowinsky's children who grew up at the park was his daughter, Xenia Noelle Field, the prison reformer and horticulturist, and the surrealist artist Thomas Esmond Lowinsky.

== John Lennon ==
Lennon purchased the property after the sale of Kenwood in Weybridge, Surrey, his earlier home with first wife Cynthia Lennon, because of its resemblance to Calderstones House in Liverpool, where he had spent time as a child. Lennon bought the house for £150,000 from the estate of Ron Blindell who had purchased it from Peter Cadbury in 1964. The estate included gardens, a Tudor cottage and servants' cottages. He and Ono spent twice the purchase price on renovations, transforming the interior of the house to their liking, commissioning a set of hand-woven Asian rugs, and installing a man-made lake without planning permission which they could see from their bedroom window.

In response to a request from George Harrison, Lennon allowed members of the Radha Krishna Temple to stay on the estate before they could move into their London temple. The devotees, who also recorded with Harrison for Apple Records, lived in the former servants' quarters on the property and assisted with renovations. When their leader, Swami Prabhupada, first visited England in September 1969, he also stayed at Tittenhurst Park at Lennon's invitation. A recording of Prabhupada's philosophical discussion with Lennon, Ono and Harrison, held in the recital hall in the grounds of Tittenhurst Park, was later made available as Lennon '69: Search for Liberation, the first publication in the Vedic Contemporary Library Series. Following this meeting, the recital hall became known as "the Tittenhurst Temple".

The last Beatles photo session took place at Tittenhurst Park on 22 August 1969, and the photos were used for the front and back covers of their Hey Jude album (a collection of single sides) early in 1970. Also during that year, and in the wake of the Beatles' break-up, Lennon engaged Eddie Veale to build his own recording studio, dubbed Ascot Sound Studios, in the estate grounds, where he and Ono recorded much of their 1971 solo albums. The matching cover photos of the couple's twin Plastic Ono Band albums were taken at Tittenhurst by the pair, using an Instamatic camera, and portions of the Imagine film-length video, which included selections from the Fly album, were also filmed in the grounds. The interior was also used as the backdrop for the film that was used to promote the single "Imagine", with Ono seen opening the window shutters as Lennon plays a white grand piano.

During 1970 and 1971, Lennon and Ono began to visit the United States, first for primal therapy at Arthur Janov's Primal Institute in California, then for child custody hearings over Ono's daughter Kyoko Chan Cox, in Houston and New York City. Ono had spent her late teens and twenties living in New York (including Scarsdale and Greenwich Village), and preferred there to England. They rented a Bank Street apartment late in 1970 and, on 31 August 1971, the Lennons moved to New York City permanently. Lennon would never return to England.

Tittenhurst was Grade II listed for its architectural merit in March 1972.

In 2004 Peter Dennison, owner of the French furniture firm Moth, offered for sale one of the original lavatory seats from Tittenhurst Park. It was displayed in the window of the Brighton Musical Exchange shop in Trafalgar Street, Brighton. Dennison had bought the seat when his architectural salvage firm was offered furniture by the contractors doing the renovations at Tittenhurst Park. The asking price was £285. In 2010 the lavatory itself was offered for sale at auction in aid of the Paul McCartney Auditorium at the Liverpool Institute for Performing Arts. Lennon told the builder John Hancock to keep the ceramic lavatory and "use it as a plant pot" after he had installed a new one. It was stored in a shed at Hancock's home for 40 years until he died. The lot had an estimate of £750–1,000. Also offered for sale was a mono copy of Two Virgins, recorded at Kenwood (estimate £2,500) and Julian Lennon's harmonica, given to Hancock by the musician who asked him to take it home as "Julian was driving him mad with it". Lennon told Hancock he would tell Julian it was lost (estimate £750–1,000).

In December 2015, several additional items from Tittenhurst Park were put up for sale as part of the Ringo Starr & Barbara Bach Auction held by Julien's Auctions. These items were originally owned by John Lennon and Yoko Ono, and were included in the sale of Tittenhurst Park to Ringo Starr in 1973. Items included several carved bust statues depicted on the Hey Jude album cover, a wood refectory table and benches, a stone garden bench, several stained glass panels and a mirror panel with floral and foliate silver overlay.

== Ascot Sound Studios ==
Ascot Sound Studios was a recording studio built by John Lennon and Yoko Ono in 1970, on the grounds of Tittenhurst Park.

Lennon built the studio, which featured eight recording tracks on one-inch open-reel tape and a sixteen-channel mixing console, so that he and Ono could record without the inconvenience of having to book studio time at Abbey Road or another location. Lennon recorded much of his 1971 album Imagine at ASS, with Phil Spector and Ono as his co-producers. George Harrison played on several songs, including "How Do You Sleep?", which criticised his and Lennon's former bandmate Paul McCartney. Ringo Starr visited the studio during the recording of the song and was reportedly upset, saying: "That's enough, John." The album sessions were extensively filmed, and the footage appears in both the Imagine: John Lennon documentary and a separate documentary about the making of the album.

Recorded at the same time as Imagine was Ono's album Fly (whose title song was the soundtrack to their film of the same name), and these appear to be the last recordings the couple completed at the studio.

== Ringo Starr; Startling Studios ==
Deciding to stay long-term in the United States, Lennon sold Tittenhurst Park to his former bandmate Starr, who purchased the property on 18 September 1973. Starr renamed the studio "Startling Studios" and made the facility available for use by other recording artists. Portions of T. Rex's film Born to Boogie were shot there. Judas Priest planned to record their British Steel album at Startling Studios, but found the house itself more suitable, and moved recording equipment there. Judas Priest's live album Unleashed in the East was also mixed and completed there. Def Leppard's 1980 debut album On Through the Night was also recorded there.

== Sheikh Zayed bin Sultan Al Nahyan ==
In 1988 Starr sold the property for £5 million to Sheikh Zayed bin Sultan Al Nahyan, former President of the United Arab Emirates and former ruler of Abu Dhabi. Zayed also owned Park Gate House in Ham, south west London, and would buy another property in Berkshire, Ascot Place, the year after his purchase of Tittenhurst. During Zayed's subsequent renovations of Tittenhurst in 1989 and 1990, master recordings and films from Startling Studios and paintings by Lennon on the walls of the house were destroyed, and a three-metre-high (10 ft) wall was constructed around the perimeter of the property.

Sheikh Zayed bin Sultan Al Nahyan died on 2 November 2004. The property remains in the ownership of the Al Nahyan Family.

== See also ==
- The Dakota, Lennon's home in the US
