= Landover Hills, Maryland =

- Town
- Town of Landover Hills
- Flag Seal
- Motto: "Maryland with Pride!"
- Location of Landover Hills, Maryland
- Coordinates: 38°56′36″N 76°53′27″W
- Country: United States of America
- State: Maryland
- County: Prince George's
- Incorporated: 1945

Area
  - Total: 0.37 sq mi (0.95 km^{2})
  - Land: 0.37 sq mi (0.95 km^{2})
  - Water: 0 sq mi (0.00 km^{2})
- Elevation: 160 ft (50 m)

Population (2020)
  - Total: 1,815
  - Density: 4,943.6/sq mi (1,908.74/km^{2})
- Time zone: UTC-5 (Eastern (EST))
  - Summer (DST): UTC-4 (EDT)
- ZIP code: 20784
- Area codes: 301, 240
- FIPS code: 24-45400
- GNIS feature ID: 0597656
- Website: Town of Landover Hills

Landover Hills is a town in Prince George's County, Maryland, United States. Per the 2020 census, the population was 1,815. The town has a neighborhood named Defense Heights.

== History ==
Landover Hills was incorporated in 1945.

== Geography ==
Landover Hills is located at 38°56'36" North, s76°53'27" West (38.943244, -76.890811).

According to the United States Census Bureau, the town has a total area of 0.30 square miles (0.78 km^{2}), all land.

=== Adjacent areas ===
- Woodlawn (northwest)
- Landover (south)
- East Riverdale (northeast)
- New Carrollton (northeast)
- Bladensburg (west)
- District of Columbia (west)

== Demographics ==
Historical population
Census	Pop.	Note	%±
1950	1,661		—
1960	1,850		11.4%
1970	2,409		30.2%
1980	1,428		−40.7%
1990	2,074		45.2%
2000	1,534		−26.0%
2010	1,687		10.0%
2020	1,815		7.6%
U.S. Decennial Census; 2010 2020

=== Racial and ethnic composition ===
Landover Hills town, Maryland – Racial and ethnic composition Note: the US Census treats Hispanic/Latino as an ethnic category. This table excludes Latinos from the racial categories and assigns them to a separate category. Hispanics/Latinos may be of any race.
Race / Ethnicity (NH = Non-Hispanic)	Pop 2000	Pop 2010	Pop 2020	% 2000	% 2010	% 2020
White alone (NH)	399	211	140	26.01%	12.51%	7.71%
Black or African American alone (NH)	973	707	533	63.43%	41.91%	29.37%
Native American or Alaska Native alone (NH)	5	10	1	0.33%	0.59%	0.06%
Asian alone (NH)	14	24	18	0.91%	1.42%	0.99%
Native Hawaiian or Pacific Islander alone (NH)	1	0	1	0.07%	0.00%	0.06%
Other race alone (NH)	1	8	15	0.07%	0.47%	0.83%
Mixed race or Multiracial (NH)	26	38	53	1.69%	2.25%	2.92%
Hispanic or Latino (any race)	115	689	1,054	7.50%	40.84%	58.07%
Total	1,534	1,687	1,815	100.00%	100.00%	100.00%

=== 2020 census ===
As of the 2020 census, Landover Hills had a population of 1,815. The median age was 33.7 years. 27.7% of residents were under the age of 18 and 9.8% were 65 years of age or older. For every 100 females there were 104.4 males, and for every 100 females age 18 and over there were 101.2 males age 18 and over.

100.0% of residents lived in urban areas, while 0.0% lived in rural areas.

There were 485 households, of which 51.5% had children under the age of 18 living in them. Of all households, 49.1% were married-couple households, 20.6% were households with a male householder and no spouse or partner present, and 24.7% were households with a female householder and no spouse or partner present. About 13.4% of all households were made up of individuals, and 6.4% had someone living alone who was 65 years of age or older.

There were 504 housing units, of which 3.8% were vacant. The homeowner vacancy rate was 0.7% and the rental vacancy rate was 0.0%.

=== 2010 census ===
As of the 2010 census, there were 1,687 people, 496 households, and 381 families residing in the town. The population density was 5,623.3 inhabitants per square mile (2,171.2/km^{2}). There were 549 housing units at an average density of 1,830.0 per square mile (706.6/km^{2}). The racial makeup of the town was 22.1% White, 43.3% African American, 1.4% Native American, 1.4% Asian, 27.4% from other races, and 4.4% from two or more races. Hispanic or Latino of any race were 40.8% of the population.

There were 496 households, of which 48.0% had children under the age of 18 living with them, 49.4% were married couples living together, 21.2% had a female householder with no husband present, 6.3% had a male householder with no wife present, and 23.2% were non-families. 19.4% of all households were made up of individuals, and 5.2% had someone living alone who was 65 years of age or older. The average household size was 3.40 and the average family size was 3.78.

The median age in the town was 31.3 years. 29.2% of residents were under the age of 18; 10% were between the ages of 18 and 24; 31.9% were from 25 to 44; 23.4% were from 45 to 64; and 5.5% were 65 years of age or older. The gender makeup of the town was 50.1% male and 49.9% female.

=== 2000 census ===
At the 2000 census, the median income for a household in the town was $55,313, and the median income for a family was $55,938. Males had a median income of $31,842 versus $32,464 for females. The per capita income for the town was $18,779. About 10.1% of families and 11.0% of the population were below the poverty line, including 16.7% of those under age 18 and 6.2% of those age 65 or over.

== Government ==
Landover Hills operates under a mayor–council–town manager system. Its elected officials include a mayor and six town council members, who serve staggered four-year terms. The town manager is appointed and oversees daily municipal operations.

=== Civic services ===
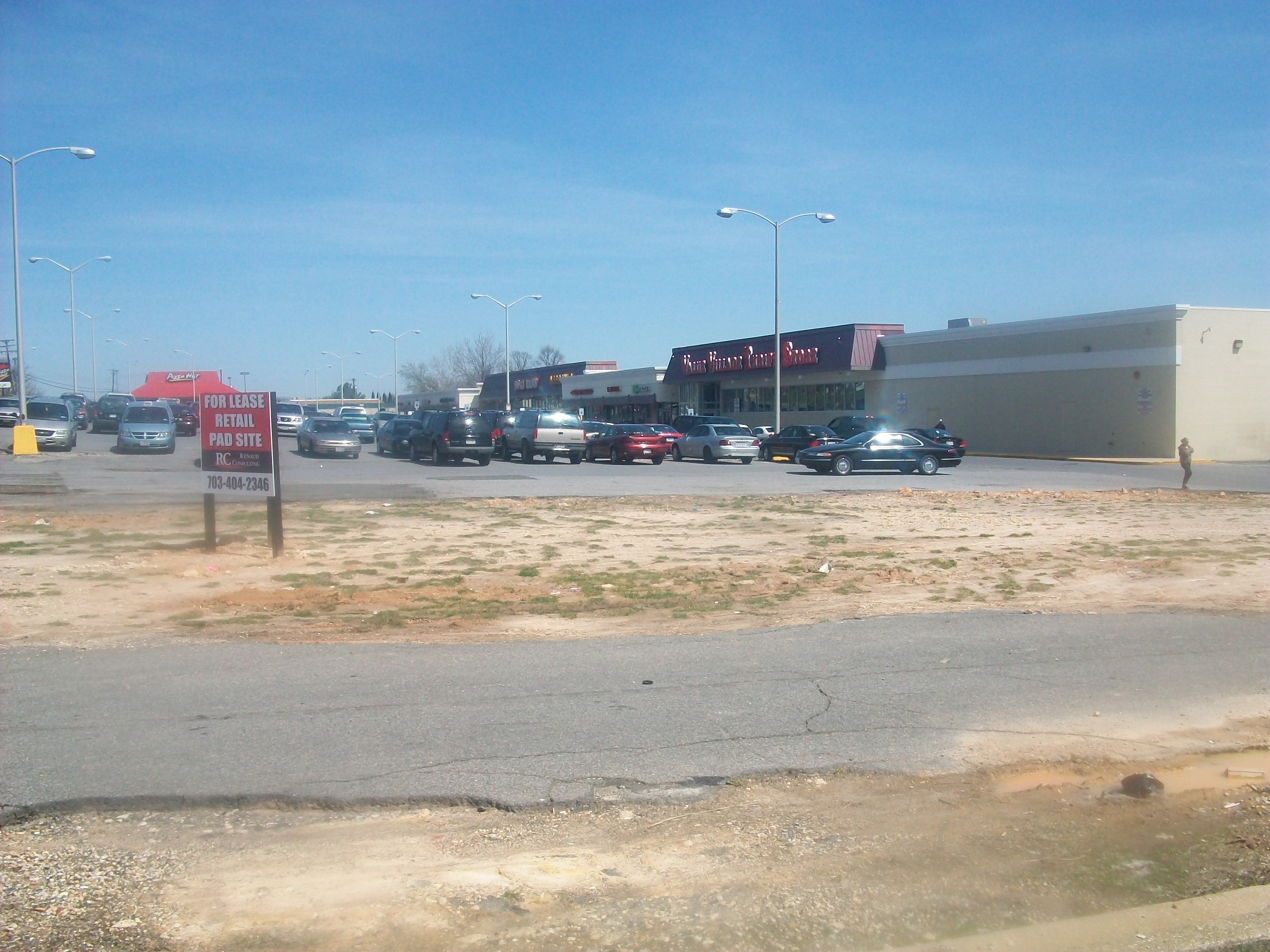
The Crestview Square shopping center

The town's fire department is a combination career/volunteer fire department and operates an engine company, a BLS ambulance, an ALS medic unit, and a medical ambulance bus.

The U.S. Postal Service operates the Landover Hills Post Office adjacent to the town, in an unincorporated area with a Hyattsville postal address.

== Transportation ==
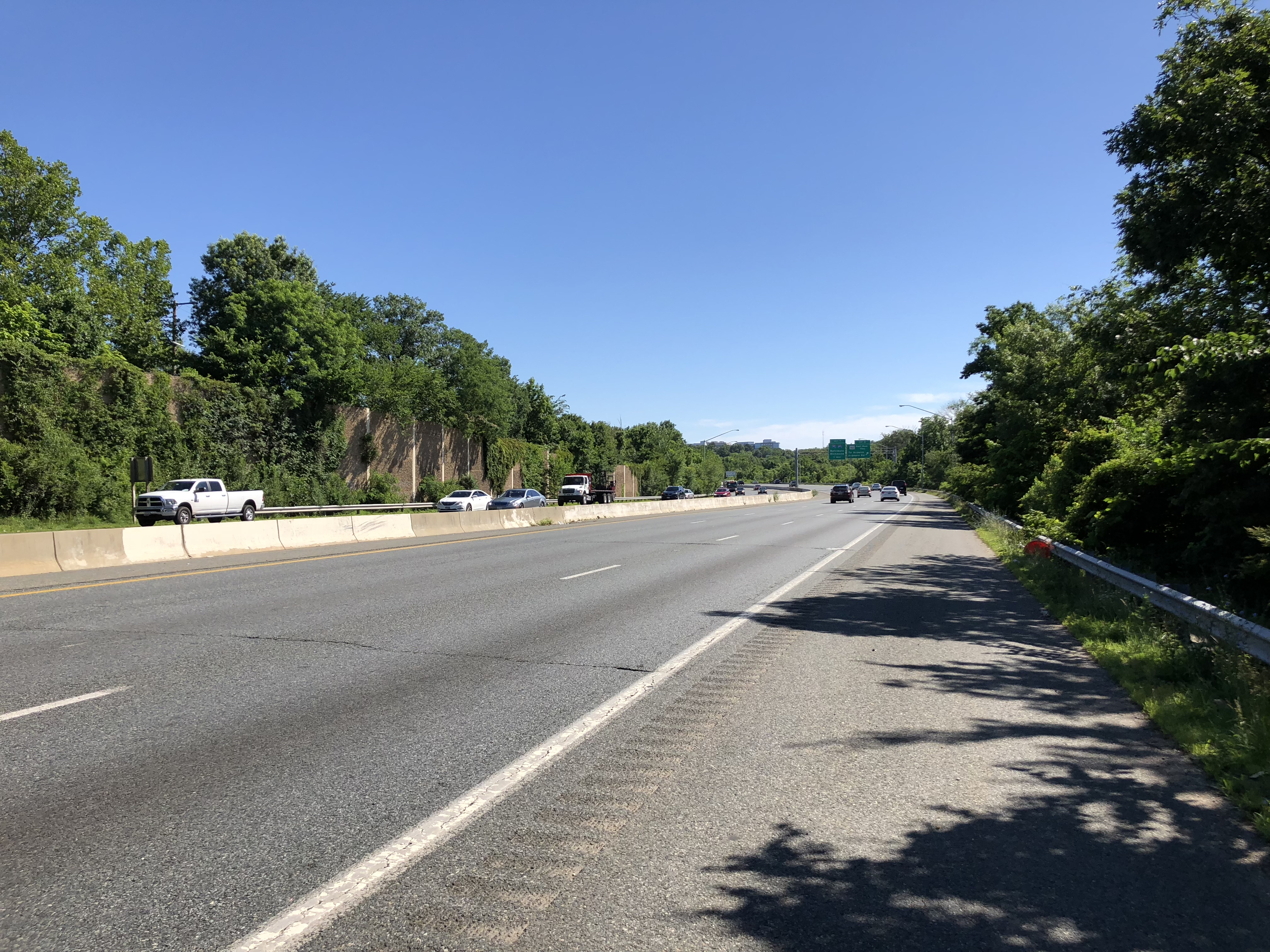
US 50 eastbound in Landover Hills

The largest highway serving Landover Hills is U.S. Route 50, which skims the southeast edge of town. There is no direct access between US 50 and the surface streets of Landover Hills, with the nearest interchange being just outside the town limits at Maryland Route 410. MD 410 connects to Maryland Route 450, which serves as the main surface highway providing direct access to Landover Hills.

== Education ==
Landover Hills falls under the jurisdiction of Prince George's County Public Schools. Its territory is zoned to multiple schools:

Elementary schools:

- Cooper Lane Elementary School (Pre K-6)
- Judge Sylvania S. Woods Elementary School (Pre K-6)

The zoned middle school is Charles Carroll Middle School (7-8). Parkdale High School (9-12) serves Landover Hills.

Private schools in the Landover Hills area are:

- New Hope Academy (3yrs-12th grade) - in the town limits
- Saint Mary's School (Catholic; preschool-8th grade) - in the town limits
- Ascension Lutheran School (K-8th grade) - Adjacent to the town.

== Infrastructure ==
=== Law enforcement ===
The Landover Hills Police Department (LHPD) is the primary law enforcement agency servicing the municipality. The LHPD is assisted by the Prince George's County Police and Sheriff's Office as directed by authority. The agency also doubles as the town code enforcement when needed.
