= Salvadoran Americans =

Americans of Salvadoran birth or descent

Salvadoran Americans Salvadoreño-Estadounidenses
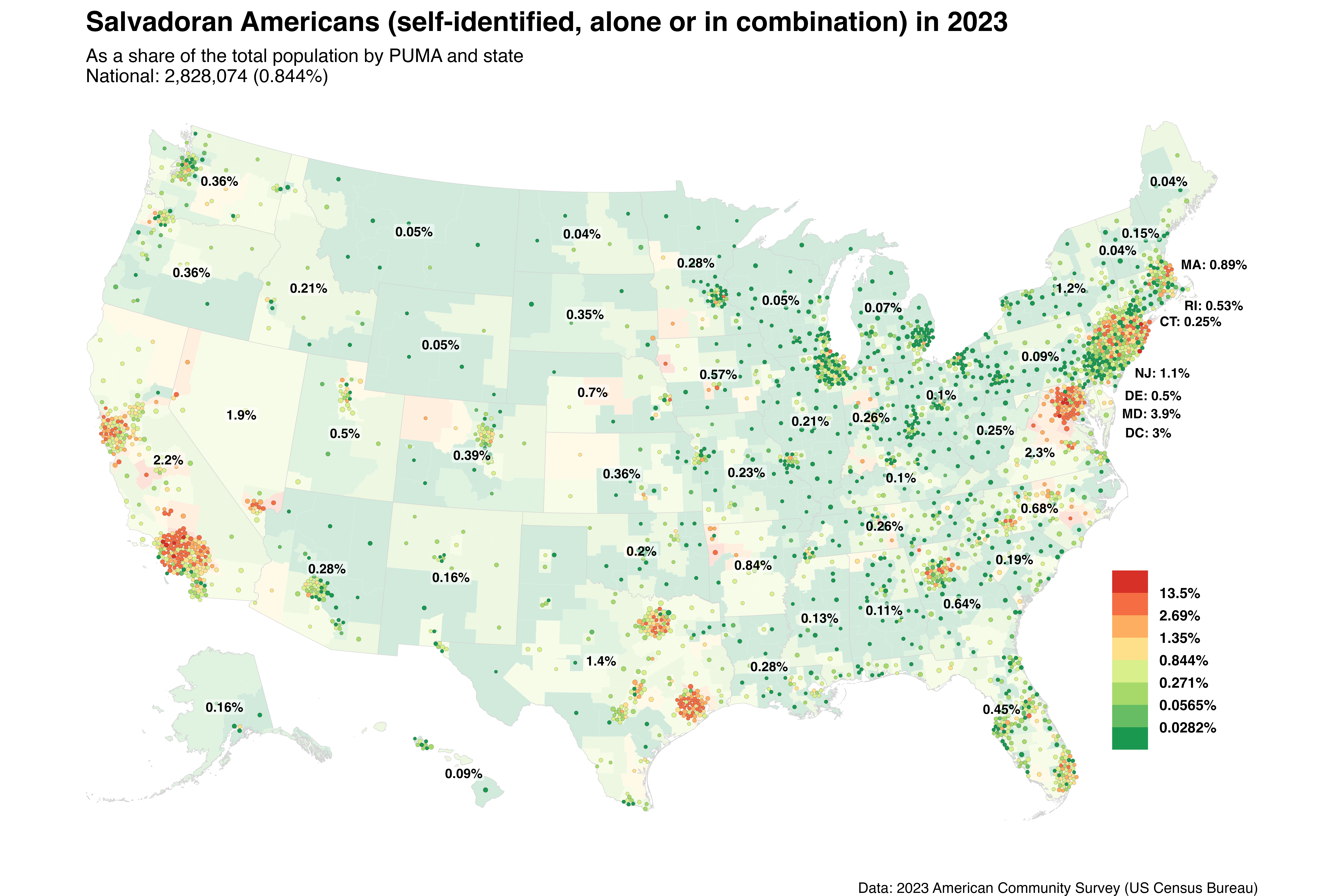

Total population
- 2,619,946 (2023 American Community Survey); 0.78% of the U.S. population (2023)

Regions with significant populations
- New York City, Long Island, Western New York, Boston, Philadelphia, New Jersey, Rhode Island, Chicago, Milwaukee, Delaware, Maryland, Washington, D.C., Northern Virginia, Raleigh, Atlanta, Miami, Louisville, Fayetteville–Springdale–Rogers metropolitan area, Oklahoma, Greater Houston, Dallas, Las Vegas Valley, Denver, Seattle, Greater Los Angeles, San Francisco Bay Area, San Diego

Languages
- Spanish, English, Spanglish

Religion
- Christianity (mostly Catholic, significantly Protestant)

Related ethnic groups
- Salvadorans, other Hispanic Americans, Afro-Salvadorans, Indian Americans, Chinese Americans, Japanese Americans, Korean Americans, Native Americans

Salvadoran Americans (Spanish: salvadoreño-estadounidenses or estadounidenses de origen salvadoreño) are Americans of full or partial Salvadoran descent. As of 2024, there are 2,770,000 Salvadoran Americans in the United States, the fourth-largest Hispanic community by nation of ancestry. According to the Census Bureau, in 2021 Salvadorans made up 4.0% of the total Hispanic population in the United States.

Salvadorans are the largest group of Central Americans of the Central American Isthmus community in the U.S.

The largest Salvadoran populations are in the metropolitan areas of Los Angeles and Washington, D.C., which have been established since the 1970s and currently number in the hundreds of thousands, as well as other Central Americans such as Guatemalan and Honduran Americans.

Salvadorans are concentrated in California (32% of the nationwide Salvadoran population), Texas (15%), Maryland (8%) and New York (8%).

== History ==
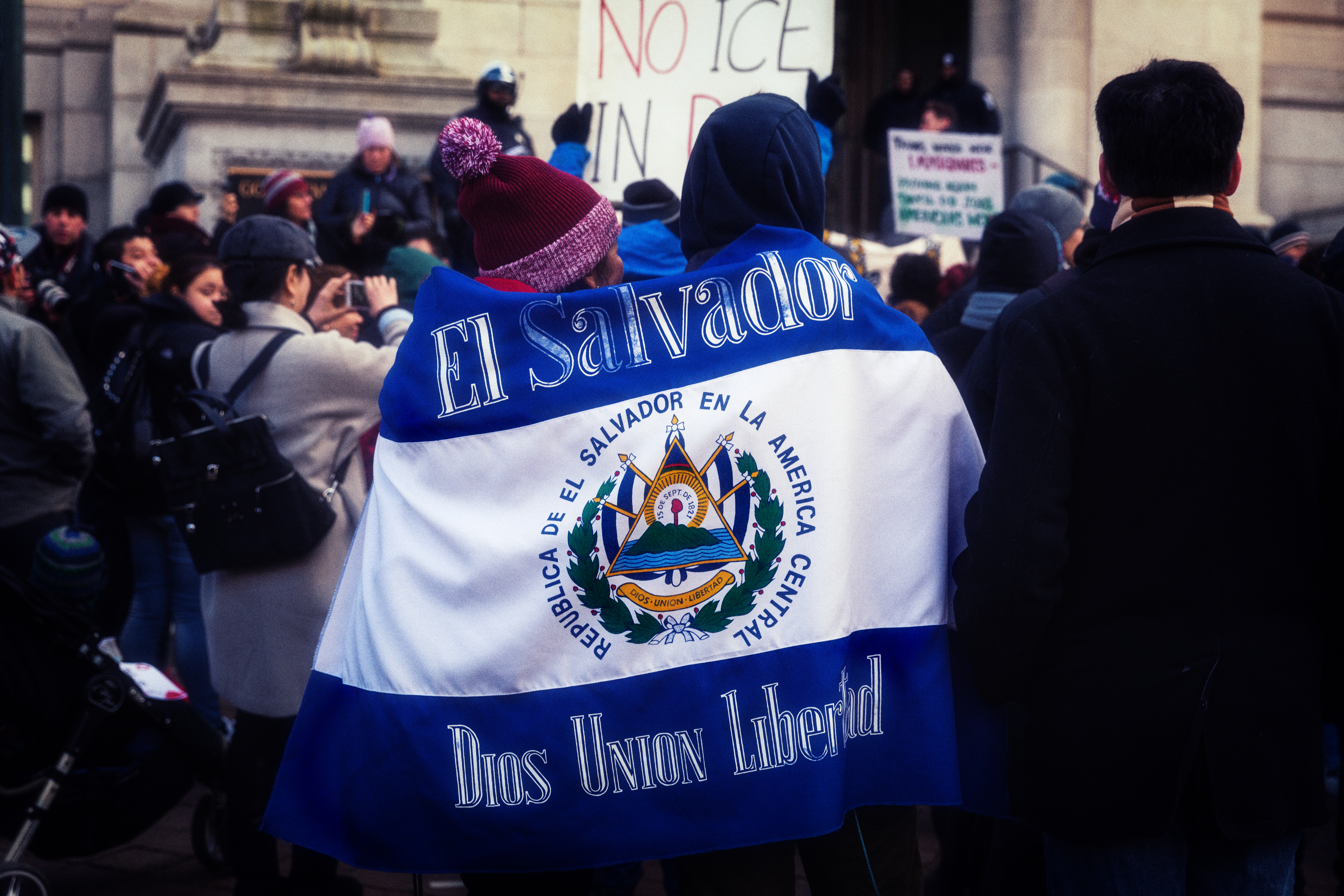
El Salvador flag in A Day Without Immigrants March & Rally

The first Salvadorans immigrants began arriving in the early twentieth century, mostly in San Francisco where they worked as shipyard employees. Salvadorans that came during this period were mostly economic migrants, as El Salvador was affected by economic turmoil during the Great Depression and slow growth after World War II ended. In the 1960s and early 1970s, most of the immigrants were women; they found work as housekeepers or in childcare.

During the ongoing civil war for about 12 years, approximately 1 million Salvadorans fled the country seeking refugee in neighboring countries, and about 50 percent of them immigrated to the United States. Over the past 20 years more Salvadorans have abandoned their homeland and immigrated to the United States due to social inequality, disputes over social and political issues, and an increase in violence in the smallest and most densely populated country in Central America .

El Salvador created a new system similar to the Mexican case called United for Solidarity to take advantage of the remittances and invest the money well in projects for the community. However, the United for Solidarity project did not stop the waves of violence by gangs and political corruption that haunt the country in the past twenty-eight years, increasing in the past ten years, forcing people to emigrate to the United States looking for a better lifestyle and safety.

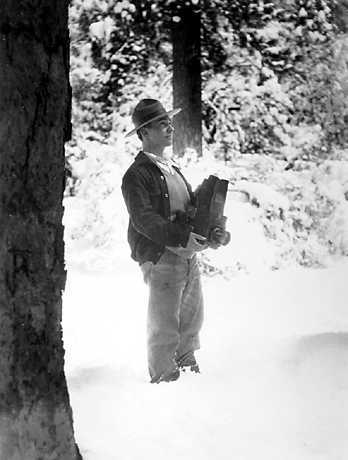
George Melendez Wright was an American biologist who conducted the first scientific survey of fauna for the National Park Service

=== Increased migration (1980s-) ===
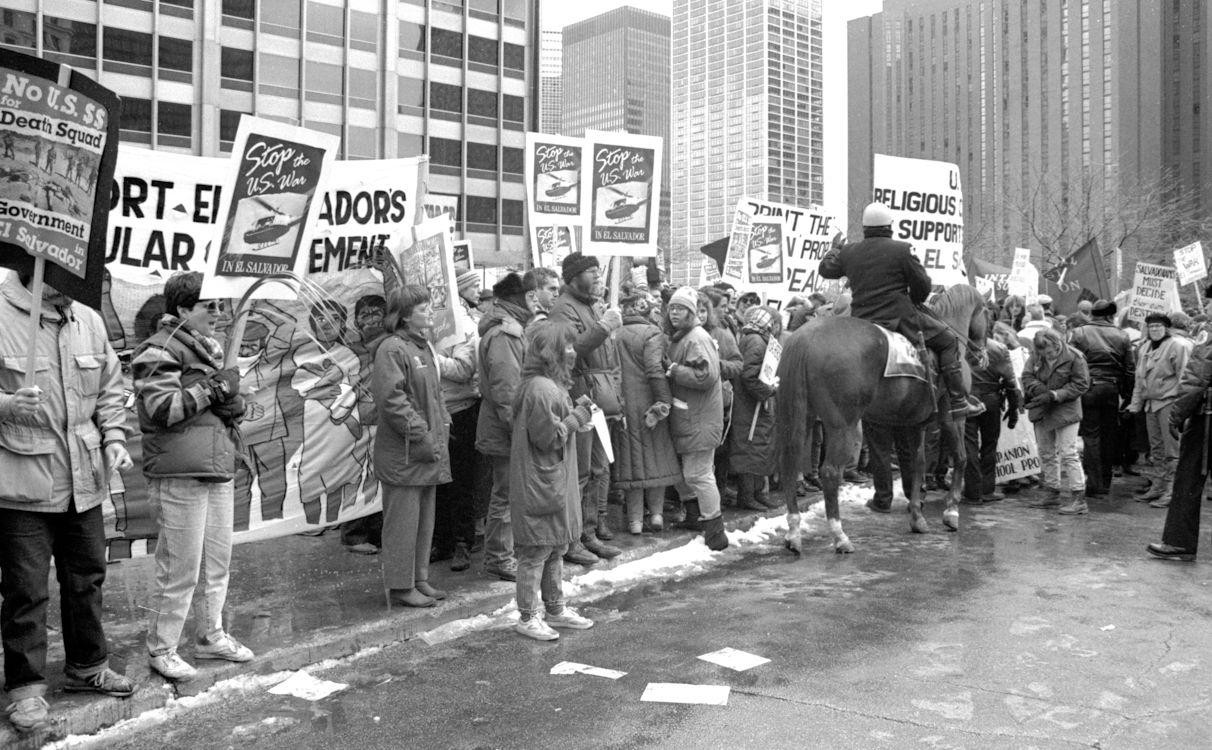
Protest against U.S. involvement in the Salvadoran Civil War in Chicago, Illinois, in March 1989

While Salvadoran migration to the U.S. remained low throughout the first several decades in the 20th century, it spiked at the onset of the Salvadoran Civil War, where many fled to the United States seeking sanctuary from the devastation that plagued the country. Some scholars have argued that the economic devastation wrought by the conflict is a greater factor in migration than political violence. At least half of the refugees—between 500,000 and one million—immigrated to the United States, which was home to less than 10,000 Salvadorans before 1960.

All this movement and shift was due to the fact that the Spanish wanted to increase the productivity and profitability of coffee cultivation, therefore the government sold off communal lands, where a large number of indigenous Salvadorans resided. Despite community organizing against land privatization, the government moved forward with turning these lands into coffee plantations, favoring affluent European immigrants and local ladino (or mestizo) families who were establishing the nation. Coffee exports were controlled by a small group of local elites, and the labor force was made up mostly of displaced peasants who were indigenous in origin. This left them no choice but to leave since they were taken as a minority.

The proximate causes of migration have been studied by analyzing spatial origins. One method is to compare maps of political violence with maps of the origins of Salvadoran migrants, though this type of aggregate analysis could not state with certainty the motivation of any individual migrant. According to William Stanley, this massive migration to the U.S. was a result of political violence as much as it was the deteriorating economic conditions in El Salvador, but this is disputed by other scholars. Stanley wrote that political violence was an "important and probably the dominant motivation" driving Salvadoran migration to the U.S., but in 1990 Richard Jones argued that "...this statement is too strong. It implies that migrants to the United States were directly uprooted from their places of origin by political violence. However, other scenarios are possible. The migrants may have been persons from nonconflictual zones who were forced to emigrate when refugees from elsewhere in the country displaced them or because of general economic deterioration."

Organizations including the ACLU, the U.S. Committee for Refugees and various church groups have argued that the cause of migration is political violence and persecution, but the U.S. State Department and Justice department believe it is the deteriorating economic conditions. The strict standard applied to petitions for asylum has reflected the view that asylum seekers must show a "clear probability of persecution." These standards were so strict that 97% of asylum applicants during the 1980s were denied. There was some hope though when the U.S. government granted extended voluntary departure to Salvadorans who had entered the country illegally since 1982. Almost a decade later this issue was brought up in the 1990 class action lawsuit, American Baptist Church v. Attorney General Richard Thornburgh. ABC v. Thornburgh challenged the mass denial of asylum applications which occurred under the Immigration and Naturalization Service (INS). The Department of Justice, which INS worked under, accepted responsibility for these denials in December 1990. This case opened the door for asylum seekers and forced the INS to look at thousands of petitions on a case-by-case basis. Despite the win, limited resources of the INS has left these people in limbo, though they were granted protected from deportation.

In respect to the debate surrounding the Salvadoran diaspora and the unwillingness of the Justice and U.S. State Department to grant refugee status, one must acknowledge the implications this status for Salvadoran migrants has on the U.S. government itself as well. There is a distinct difference in being an immigrant compared to a refugee, not only in a legal sense, but also in societal perception. Holding the status of an immigrant is characterized by being influenced by economic push or pull factors, not necessarily by life-threatening events. Refugee status is specifically for those fleeing from persecution and violence, and therefore are more promptly welcomed into the country. During the Salvadoran civil war, the Salvadoran government and the opposing guerilla forces were absolutely perpetuating violence in the country that directly affected and involved civilians. Elana Zilberg addresses these happenings in her writing, even children were not exempt from horrible events, "They[youth] had seen tortured corpses and severed body parts...boys no more than twelve years old were forcefully conscripted into the army. Children joined the guerrillas"[72]. With this violence in mind, the fact that more Salvadorans were not granted temporary protected status or asylum has to do with the part the U.S. played in the Salvadoran civil war. The Cold War sentiments were still existent in the 1980s- and El Salvador became the stage to a proxy war between the U.S. and the USSR. The USSR was financially supporting and training guerilla forces to aid them in achieving a communist government, therefore the U.S. funded weapons and training for the Salvadoran government army to maintain their idea of democracy as well. However, the Salvadoran government and army, besides forcefully using children as soldiers, were also the perpetuators of other human rights violations against their civilians. To put the U.S. as a supporter of this political group was to implicate them as a supporter of a government guilty of violence and oppression against their people if it was decided that there were necessary reasons for them to be fleeing their country, "Salvadorans were thus left out of the refugee policy of United States and its system-a kindness calculated firmly within the Cold War interests"[72].

Salvadorans that came to the United States undocumented applied for asylum and/or work permits in order to legalize their status. Many of these Salvadoran refugees came to the city of Los Angeles, which today holds the largest population of Salvadorans in the country. A large population of Salvadorans also arrived in Washington, D.C.; which by 1989, an estimated 150,000 Salvadorans resided in the nation's capital.

In comparison to their rural, working class, and often undocumented counterparts migrating to Los Angeles, Washington, D.C., and Houston; wealthy Salvadorans also found refuge in the U.S., migrating to Coral Gables and Key Biscayne in Miami. They numbered over 1,000 individuals and many of them are temporary exiles, who planned to go back after the end of the war. By the end of 1989, more than 250,000 Salvadorans migrated to the U.S. Unofficially, there were one million Salvadorans that came to the U.S.

The migration of Salvadorans was a result of both economic and political problems. The largest immigration wave occurred as a result of the Salvadoran Civil War in the 1980s, in which 20%–30% of El Salvador's population emigrated. About 50% percent, or up to 500,000 of those who escaped the country headed to the U.S., which was already home to over 10,000 Salvadorans, making Salvadorans Americans the third-largest Hispanic American group, after the Mexican American majority and Cubans (when not including Stateside Puerto Ricans). Salvadorans however are predicted to replace Cubans as the largest population by the next census.

The country of El Salvador was subjected to economic, political difficulties and wars, creating few opportunities in the country to grow economically for citizens, which impacted many Salvadoran citizens looking for new lands to settle for better opportunities.

The number of Salvadoran immigrants in the United States continued to grow in the 1990s and 2000s as a result of family reunification and new arrivals fleeing a series of natural disasters that affected El Salvador, including the January 2001 and February 2001 earthquakes and Hurricane Mitch. Gang warfare, which made El Salvador one of the dangerous countries in the world, also contributed to the surge of immigrants seeking asylum in the late part of the 2000s and the first four years in the 2010s. By 2008, there were about 1.1 million Salvadoran immigrants in the United States. Salvadorans are the country's fifth largest immigrant group after Mexican, Filipino, Indian, and Chinese foreign born.

Another issue why Salvadorans migrated to the United States was when the horrific earthquake happened, and the program known as "TPS" stands for Temporary Protected Status, opened. The program was judged by ex-President Trump and wanted to take off the program. This means many Salvadorans who still are on the program were going to be dealing with illegal status, and they were not going to be allowed to work in the United States lawfully, meaning most of them were going to lose their jobs. This brought sadness and scariness to many families who thought they would be deported and sent to El Salvador.

Documented Salvadorans in the U.S.
Years	# of Salvadorans entering the U.S.
1931–1940	673
1941–1950	5,132
1951–1960	5,895
1961–1970	14,992
1971–1980	34,436
1981–1990	213,539
1991–2000	215,798

== Language ==
In the U.S., Salvadorans speak both English and Spanish, but their use varies. Recent immigrants and older generations tend to speak Spanish exclusively, while the newer generations (descendants of immigrants) learn Spanish as a first language only to become fluent in English when they start school. According to the American Community Survey of 2004, 5.2 percent of Salvadorans only speak English at home, the lowest compared to other immigrant populations. The percentage of “non-English at home, English spoken “very well” is at 36.2, the third lowest after the Guatemalans and the Hondurans.

Salvadoran Spanish is one of the most common dialects of Spanish spoken in the United States. Salvadorans speak Spanish that makes use of the medieval voseo pronoun equivalent to thou, making them the largest voseo Spanish speakers in the country. This is commonly shown in the usage of the Spanish word "vos" as opposed to the usual "tú." While not a unique characteristic to Salvadoran Spanish, the use of "vos" is a major difference between Salvadoran Spanish and Mexican Spanish. In Washington D.C., Salvadoran Spanish is the most common dialect of Spanish spoken, while in Los Angeles, Salvadoran Spanish is the second-most common Spanish dialect, after Mexican Spanish. Salvadoran Spanish consists of many Native American/Indigenous words from the Lenca and Pipil language that survived the European conquest and rule of El Salvador.

In the study, Voseo to Tuteo Accommodation Among Two Salvadoran Communities in the United States by Travis Doug Sorenson, Sorenson compared two Salvadoran communities, Houston and Washington, D.C., on the way they maintain the use of voseo in the U.S. where the tuteo form is most widely spoken. His research found that while Salvadorans are the majority of the Latin American population in Washington, D.C., they use the voseo form as much as their counterparts in Houston; a city with a large Mexican population that used the tuteo form instead. The hypothesis that Salvadorans participants in Washington would significantly retain more voseo than their compatriots in Houston was wrong.

== Religious affiliation ==
Reflecting the country's namesake, most Salvadorans are Christian. Traditionally, Salvadorans are Roman Catholics, but since the civil war, there has been a notable increase of Evangelicals or other Protestant denominations in the country. There is also a small Jewish community, and most of its members are business owners. Some Salvadoran Americans converted to Latter-day Saints or Jehovah Witness. Younger generations of Salvadoran Americans are less likely to practice any type of religion than their parents.

During the civil war, some members of El Salvador's Jewish community immigrated to the United States, mostly settling in the Miami and Los Angeles areas.

== Demographics ==
=== Areas of concentration ===
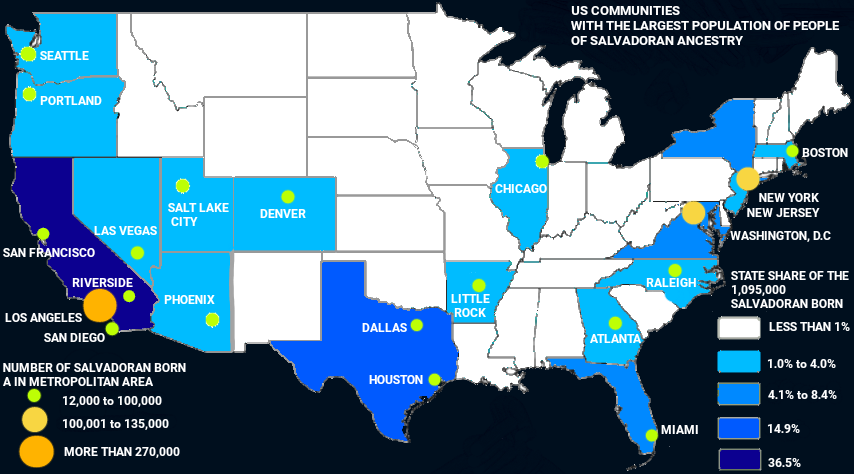
Salvadoran population in the United States

Many Salvadoran Americans reside in the Greater Los Angeles area, including Orange County, California and the Inland Empire of Southern California; San Diego; and the Washington metropolitan area: Washington, D.C., Maryland and Northern Virginia. The Washington, D.C., area is currently the only metropolitan area in the country where Salvadorans are the majority among Hispanics, and they are most concentrated in the suburbs in Northern Virginia and Maryland. In Washington, D.C., proper, 32 percent of the Hispanic population are Salvadorans, the largest in the city. Salvadorans settled in the neighborhoods of Mount Pleasant, Adams Morgan, and Columbia Heights. In the Richmond and Baltimore metro regions, Salvadoran Americans form the largest single group of Hispanics in the Metro, but not the majority. Most of these Salvadorans came from the eastern departments of San Miguel and La Union, especially from the Salvadoran towns Chirilagua and Intipuca. Formerly known as Arlandria, a neighborhood between Alexandria and Arlington in Virginia is now referred to as Chirilagua, due to the many Salvadorans living there from that particular town. The national dish of El Salvador, pupusas, can be found in DC's major league sport stadiums such as Nationals Park (MLB), D.C. United's Audi Field (MLS), FedEx Field (NFL), and LA Galaxy's Dignity Health Sports Park ( as well as hundreds of other locations throughout the Los Angeles, DC, Maryland, Virginia metro area.

There is also a large number of Salvadorans in Texas, especially in Houston, Austin, Dallas and Fort Worth; increasingly New Orleans after Hurricane Katrina in 2005; and in other California regions outside of Los Angeles such as the San Francisco Bay Area. In addition, there is a significant number of Salvadoran Americans in the New York City area such as Northern New Jersey; Flushing; Corona; Far Rockaway; Parkchester; South Bronx; Williamsburg and Long Island. In Massachusetts, Salvadorans tend to reside in Greater Boston, mostly in cities such as Chelsea, Somerville, Everett, Revere or Boston. Salvadorans have also established a significant community in the island of Nantucket (where Salvadorans account for 7.3% of the total population there as of 2010), of which a sizable majority come from the municipality of Agua Caliente, El Salvador.

Recent census data shows that for the first time, there are more Salvadorans living on Long Island than Puerto Ricans, with Salvadorans now numbering nearly 100,000, representing nearly a quarter of all Hispanics in the region, making them largest Hispanic group in Long Island. They tend to concentrate in the hamlets of Brentwood, Central Islip, North Bay Shore, Uniondale, and the village of Hempstead.

=== States ===
State	Salvadoran Population (2020 Census)	Percent
Alabama	4,491	0.1%
Alaska	1,114	0.1%
Arizona	18,722	0.3%
Arkansas	23,969	0.8%
California	731,697	1.9%
Colorado	20,653	0.4%
Connecticut	10,050	0.3%
Delaware	2,160	0.2%
District of Columbia	19,119	2.8%
Florida	77,378	0.4%
(Georgia (U.S. state)) Georgia	46,387	0.4%
Hawaii	1,405	0.1%
Idaho	2,368	0.1%
Illinois	20,263	0.2%
Indiana	15,328	0.2%
Iowa	9,212	0.4%
Kansas	8,266	0.3%
Kentucky	4,333	0.1%
Louisiana	8,916	0.2%
Maine	851	0.0%
Maryland	203,761	3.3%
Massachusetts	63,846	0.9%
Michigan	6,329	0.1%
Minnesota	12,539	0.2%
Mississippi	1,669	0.0%
Missouri	8,280	0.2%
Montana	350	0.0%
Nebraska	10,670	0.5%
Nevada	42,959	1.4%
New Hampshire	1,480	0.1%
New Jersey	77,957	0.9%
New Mexico	3,091	0.1%
New York	198,238	0.9%
North Carolina	59,983	0.6%
North Dakota	384	0.0%
Ohio	11,980	0.1%
Oklahoma	5,730	0.1%
Oregon	9,687	0.2%
Pennsylvania	14,522	0.1%
Rhode Island	4,137	0.3%
South Carolina	7,230	0.1%
South Dakota	1,805	0.2%
Tennessee	16,377	0.2%
Texas	330,231	1.2%
Utah	14,426	0.4%
Vermont	223	0.0%
Virginia	178,075	2.1%
Washington	23,983	0.3%
West Virginia	1,586	0.1%
Wisconsin	3,367	0.0%
Wyoming	399	0.0%
Total U.S. Salvadoran Population	2,342,001	0.7%

=== Metropolitan areas ===
The largest Salvadoran populations are found within these areas (Source: Census 2021)

1. Los Angeles-Long Beach-Anaheim, CA Metro Area – 469,230 (3.6%)
2. Washington-Arlington-Alexandria, DC-VA-MD-WV Metro Area – 315,279 (5.0%)
3. New York-Newark-Jersey City, NY-NJ-PA Metro Area – 250,776 (1.3%)
4. Houston-The Woodlands-Sugar Land, TX Metro Area – 206,799 (2.9%)
5. Dallas-Fort Worth-Arlington, TX Metro Area – 96,482 (1.3%)
6. San Francisco-Oakland-Berkeley, CA Metro Area – 96,160 (2.0%)
7. Riverside-San Bernardino-Ontario, CA Metro Area – 64,420 (1.4%)
8. Boston-Cambridge-Newton, MA-NH Metro Area – 60,328 (1.2%)
9. Miami-Fort Lauderdale-Pompano Beach, FL Metro Area – 44,721 (0.7%)
10. Las Vegas-Henderson-Paradise, NV Metro Area – 35,747 (1.6%)
11. Atlanta-Sandy Springs-Alpharetta, GA Metro Area – 32,949 (0.5%)
12. Baltimore-Columbia-Towson, MD Metro Area – 30,399 (1.1%)
13. Charlotte-Concord-Gastonia, NC-SC Metro Area – 19,554 (0.7%)
14. Chicago-Naperville-Elgin, IL-IN-WI Metro Area – 18,881 (0.2%)
15. Seattle-Tacoma-Bellevue, WA Metro Area - 16,599 (0.4%)
16. Phoenix-Mesa-Chandler, AZ Metro Area – 16,280 (0.3%)
17. San Jose-Sunnyvale-Santa Clara, CA Metro Area – 16,017 (0.8%)
18. Sacramento-Roseville-Folsom, CA Metro Area – 15,523 (0.7%)
19. Fayetteville-Springdale-Rogers, AR-MO Metro Area – 14,266 (2.7%)
20. Richmond, VA Metro Area – 13,976 (1.1%)

=== U.S. communities with largest population of people of Salvadoran ancestry ===
The top 25 U.S. communities with the highest populations of Salvadorans were (Source: Census 2020)

1. Los Angeles, CA – 247,424
2. Houston, TX – 92,943
3. New York City, NY – 44,747
4. Dallas, TX – 21,943
5. Irving, TX – 18,694
6. Brentwood, NY – 20,667
7. Washington, D.C. – 19,119
8. San Francisco, CA – 16,682
9. Charlotte, NC – 14,280
10. Palmdale, CA – 13,444
11. Las Vegas, NV – 12,164
12. Hempstead, NY – 11,845
13. Dale City, VA – 11,010
14. Oakland, CA – 10,904
15. Wheaton, MD – 10,630
16. Boston, MA – 10,252
17. Chillum, MD – 9,888
18. Elizabeth, NJ – 9,771
19. San Jose, CA – 9,422
20. Central Islip, NY – 9,071
21. Chelsea, MA – 8,739
22. Long Beach, CA – 8,576
23. Richmond, CA – 7,903
24. Arlington, VA – 7,548
25. Santa Ana, CA – 7,280

=== U.S. communities with high percentages of people of Salvadoran ancestry ===
Top U.S. communities with the highest Salvadoran ancestry in 2010:

1. Islandia, Florida 44.4%
2. Brentwood, New York 26.3%
3. New Cassel, New York 24.7%
4. Colmar Manor, Maryland 24.7%
5. North Bay Shore, New York 23.9%
6. Langley Park, Maryland 22.5%
7. Edmonston, Maryland 22.0%
8. Brentwood, Maryland 22.0%
9. Mendota, California 21.9%
10. Chillum, Maryland 21.8%
11. Uniondale, New York 20.2%
12. Hempstead, New York 19.9%
13. North Brentwood, Maryland 19.1%
14. Adelphi, Maryland 19.1%
15. Landover Hills, Maryland 19.1%
16. Central Islip, New York 18.5%
17. Wheaton, Maryland 18.5%
18. Cottage City, Maryland 18.3%
19. Woodlawn, Maryland 18.3%
20. Chelsea, Massachusetts 18.2%
21. Woodlawn, Virginia 17.9%
22. Marumsco, Virginia 17.9%
23. Roosevelt, New York 17.8%
24. Loch Lomond, Virginia 17.6%
25. Hyattsville, Maryland 16.4%
26. Sudley, Virginia 16.4%
27. Yorkshire, Virginia 16.3%
28. Huntington Station, New York 15.8%
29. Inwood, New York 15.6%
30. Herndon, Virginia 15.5%
31. East Riverdale, Maryland 15.2%
32. Mount Rainier, Maryland 14.4%
33. Sterling, Virginia 14.0%
34. Monon, Indiana 14.0%
35. El Jebel, Colorado 13.8%

The 10 large cities (over 200,000 in population) with the highest percentages of Salvadoran residents include (2020 Census):

1. Irving, TX – 7.2%
2. Los Angeles, CA – 6.3%
3. Houston, TX – 4.0%
4. Washington, DC – 2.8%
5. Oakland, CA – 2.4%
6. San Francisco, CA – 1.9%
7. Long Beach, CA – 1.8%
8. Las Vegas, NV – 1.8%
9. Charlotte, NC – 1.6%
10. Dallas, TX – 1.6%

=== U.S. communities with the most residents born in El Salvador ===
Top 25 U.S. communities with the most residents born in El Salvador are:

1. Langley Park, MD 23.6%
2. Edmonston, MD 23.0%
3. Mendota, CA 21.7%
4. Brentwood, MD 21.0%
5. Chillum, MD 20.1%
6. North Brentwood, MD 18.4%
7. Brentwood, NY 18.2%
8. Central Islip, NY 18.1%
9. New Cassel, NY 16.8%
10. Adelphi, MD 15.9%
11. Sorrento, FL 15.7%
12. Hyattsville, MD 15.6%
13. North Bay Shore, NY 15.6%
14. Inwood, NY 15.5%
15. Boswell's Corner, VA 15.5%
16. El Jebel, CO 15.4%
17. Hillandale, MD 14.6%
18. Hempstead, NY 14.4%
19. Marumsco, VA 14.3%
20. Chelsea, MA 14.1%
21. Loch Lomond, VA 13.3%
22. East Riverdale, MD 13.1%
23. Wheaton, MD 12.9%
24. West Rancho Dominguez, CA 12.6%
25. Cattle Creek, CO 12.6%

== Race and ethnicity ==
Salvadoran American – 2010 U.S Census
Self-identified Race	Percent of population
White alone	40.2%
Black	1.0%
Asian	0.3%
American Indians and Alaska Natives	1.1%
Native Hawaiians and Other Pacific Islanders	0.1%
Some Other Race	50.5%
Two or more races	6.9%
Total	100%

A PLOS ONE study analyzing population structure in the region found that European ancestry frequently constitutes the largest component of genetic admixture [1]. The data indicates that, within the studied Salvadoran population, ancestral contributions were estimated at 47.1% European, 48.2% Amerindian, and 4.7% African [1]. You can read the full study at PLOS Genetics. [1, 2]

== Socioeconomics and culture ==
According to the 2004 ACS, only 40 percent of all Salvadoran and Salvadoran American residents in the U.S. have a high school diploma, the lowest among all other Latin American groups. Only 10 percent of Salvadorans possess a bachelor's degree, also the lowest among Hispanic Americans. Nonetheless, 15 percent of Salvadorans lives under poverty (among the lowest) and the average income of Salvadorans is $40,000. In the Washington metropolitan area, Salvadorans who came to the area during the 1980s working in construction or the service sector are becoming business owners. These small business owners, numbering 4,000, usually tend to be in the construction, restaurant and cleaning industries. The Salvadoran-American Chamber of Commerce of the Washington, D.C. Metropolitan Area was created to help Salvadorans business owners with " financial consultations, legal services, general business and government information, and technical assistance." In Los Angeles, near the intersection of Pico Boulevard and Vermont Avenue, The El Salvador Community Corridor was created among other things, to help boost the economic livelihood and community pride within the large Salvadoran population. Asylum laws prohibit many Salvadorans from renewing their ties to their home culture. Most asylum seekers cannot visit El Salvador, even for a loved one's funeral, without losing their legal status in the United States. Thus, many of the U.S.' Salvadorans are torn between embracing the culture of the United States and maintaining their Salvadoran identities.

U.S.-Salvadorans form an insular community—with their own social clubs, doctors, even banks—and often have little contact with outsiders. They maintain a tight network, living almost exclusively with other people from their home country, or even their hometown. Many older immigrants have spent more than ten years in the United States without learning any English.

Although they immigrated largely out of fear rather than a desire for a new life, Salvadorans in the United States, especially the younger generations, are gradually becoming Anglicized. The U.S.-born children of Salvadoran refugees or immigrants are becoming more aware of their Salvadoran roots, even at the behest of their Salvadoran born parents. This is especially true during the 2009 Salvadoran presidential elections where the leftist party, FMLN had its best chance to win for the first time. These Salvadoran Americans, raised and taught in the U.S., understand the problems in El Salvador is facing and become more proactive on ways to address these issues. While conditions have improved in El Salvador, few refugees have returned home.

The United States—once a place of refuge—has become a new home for Salvadoran immigrants. To reflect the changing needs of the United States Salvadoran community, the Central American Refugee Center in Los Angeles (CARECEN), one of the largest support organizations for refugees, changed its name to the Central America Resource Center. This center has expanded from their political activity to incorporate community services aimed to help the community. Among the services included are education, translation, health-care, and child-care. One of the most notable centers, located in Los Angeles, had even raised $3 million for the organization by 2000.

In areas with large Salvadoran populations, festivals celebrating their culture abounds. In Los Angeles, three different Salvadoran events were celebrated in the month of August alone. In Wheaton, Maryland, Gaithersburg, Maryland, and Prince William County, Virginia, were sites of the annual Salvadoran-American Festival. Pupusas, El Salvador's national dish, have become the best and most known representation of Salvadoran culture in the mainstream United States. In some pupuserias in Maryland, they Americanized the pupusa; by using crab meat or creating a cheeseburger-style pupusa instead of the normal ingredients used (cheese and pork). The State of New York passed a resolution recognizing August 6 as Day of the Salvadoran American (Día del Salvadoreño-Americano). Similarly, in Maryland, governor Martin O’Malley declared August 5 as the Day of the Salvadoran American.

Pupusas represent a cherished culinary staple within the Salvadoran American community.

=== Social issues ===
The dominance by the gangs predominated the Salvadoran people, which is why it was one of the factors of the Salvadorans emigrating to the United States. In most of the cases, gangs influenced many people to become part of these criminal organizations.

== Political participation ==
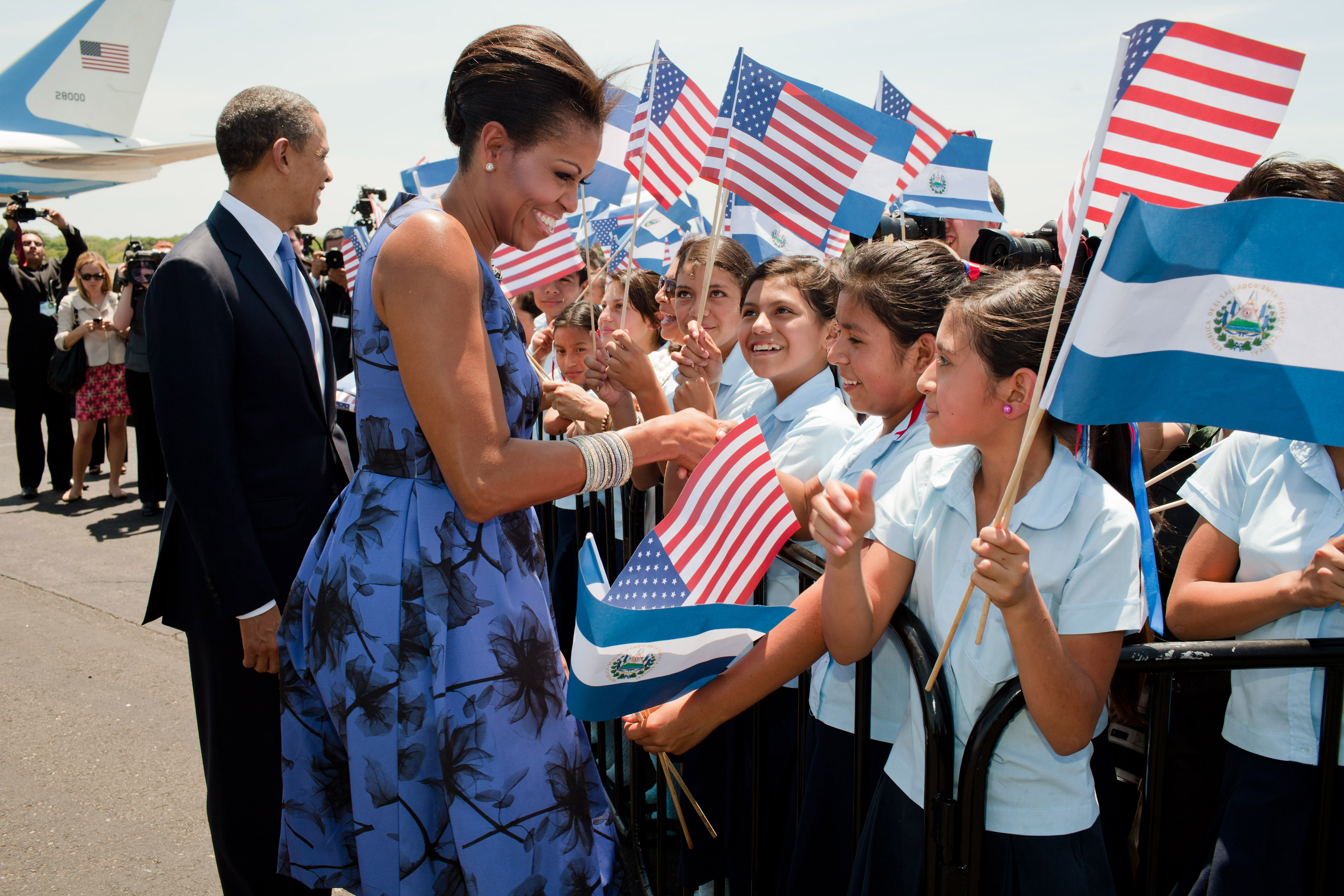
President Barack Obama and First Lady Michelle Obama greet children during the arrival ceremony at Comalapa International Airport in San Salvador, El Salvador, March 22, 2011. (Official White House Photo by Pete Souza)

Politically, Salvadorans are more involved in local and state governments than the federal government. Wendy Carrillo is serving in the California State Assembly. A Democrat, she represents the 51st State Assembly district, encompassing parts of northeastern Los Angeles and East Los Angeles. She was sworn into office by Assembly Speaker Anthony Rendon on December 16, 2017. Prior to becoming a member of the California State Assembly, she was a multimedia journalist and labor activist. The Washington, D.C., Metro Area has some Salvadoran American politicians representing the voice of the second largest Salvadoran community that lives there. Elected to the county board of the smallest self-governing county in the U.S. with the 3rd highest income, Walter Tejada is one of five members that govern Arlington County, VA; becoming the chairman of the Arlington County Board in 2013. Delegate Ana Sol Gutierrez represents the 18th District of Montgomery County, MD, the 10th highest income county in the United States. Delegate Victor R. Ramirez represents the 47th District of Prince George's County, MD, the wealthiest African American-majority county in the United States. Ramirez became the first Hispanic to serve in the Maryland State Senate in 2011. A partner of Ramirez is Prince George's County Council member William A. Campos.

In Long Island, Salvadorans have been seeking political power in towns or county boards. Monica Martinez was elected to the Suffolk County 9th legislative District in 2013. Her brother Antonio Martinez, was the first Salvadoran elected to any office in Long Island; is a Councilman in the town of Babylon, New York. Jorge Guadron and Miriam Ventura became the first Salvadoran Americans elected to the New York State Democratic Committee for the 6th Assembly District in September, 2014. Salvadoreños por el Mundo - Noticias de El Salvador - Noticias de El Salvador

In 2020, Ricky Hurtado was elected to North Carolina General Assembly as a House Representative. He represents the North Carolina's 63rd District. He became the first Hispanic Democrat to serve in the General Assembly. He was sworn on January 1, 2021.

Salvadorans do not have nearly as much influence with the political establishment as voting constituencies have. In Los Angeles, for instance, there is a stark contrast between the U.S.-born Chicano neighborhoods of East L.A. and the Pico-Union and Westlake neighborhoods, populated by immigrant Mexicans and Central Americans. The former have many community centers, legal services, and social workers; the latter have very few. This situation is slowly changing, however: Carlos Vaquerano, the Salvadoran community affairs director of CARECEN, was named to the board of Rebuild L.A., organized to help the city recover from the L.A. riots in 1992. Jorge Guadron and Miriam Ventura are the first Salvadoran Americans elected to the New York State Democratic Committee for the 6th Assembly District in Long Island. Salvadoreños por el Mundo - Noticias de El Salvador - Noticias de El Salvador

One area of U.S. politics in which Salvadoran Americans have played an important role is in legislation regarding their immigration status. In the debate leading to the passage of Temporary Protected Status for Salvadoran refugees and the extensions of that status, Salvadoran organizations lobbied politicians and brought their cases of persecution to the press. At first, refugee organizations were run by Americans, and Salvadorans often appeared in public only with bandannas over their faces. Gradually, Salvadorans and other Central Americans began to take charge of the refugee organizations and assume a higher public profile.

Salvadoran Americans have also contributed significantly to labor union activity. Many refugees fought for the right to organize under repressive conditions in El Salvador, and they brought dedication, even militancy, to American unions. In a 1990 Los Angeles janitors' strike, for instance, Salvadoran union members continued to march and demonstrate even under the threat of police violence. And Salvadoran street vendors in Los Angeles have organized to improve their precarious situation.

Firstly, the Salvadorans who arrived in the country in 1990, were balanced between Democrats and Republicans, mainly because of their anti-socialist thinking, but since the arrival of Obama, Salvadorans tend to vote mostly for Democrats, Obama promised to legalize millions of undocumented immigrants, including to Salvadorans, many family members who could go to the polls voted for Obama, In the 2020 elections, Salvadorans were the Hispanic group that voted the most for Biden by abysmal difference due to Trump's responses against immigration and TPS, no However, a year later in Virginia, many Salvadorans voted for Glenn Youngkin for governor of the state of Virginia. Glenn Youngkin is from the Republican Party, while in the 2022 elections, the Republican candidate Mike Cargile has the Salvadoran vote in the 35th district, a district where Salvadorans have historically been Democrats, and in Virginia, Yesli Vega, the Republican candidate for Congress, is the daughter of Salvadorans and has great support from Latinos, historically Democrats.the Republican party has taken the support of Yesly Vega because she is a candidate to turn a blue chair red.

== Salvadoran North Americans relations with El Salvador ==
Most Salvadoran born in the U.S. are not active in or outspoken about Salvadoran politics. Those U.S. organizations most actively involved in Salvadoran politics (such as the Committee in Solidarity with the People of El Salvador, CISPES) have attracted little participation by Salvadoran North Americans themselves. The immigrants' own organizations have focused not on politics at home, but on relief and jobs in immigrant communities throughout the United States. This relative indifference to home politics may be surprising, given the political passions that have long raged in El Salvador; but the majority of Salvadoran North Americans seem interested in putting the hatred of the past behind them.

In the 1980s several Central American solidarity organizations were created in an effort to claim their status as Salvadorans and aid those in the mainland. In 2009 groups like CISPES and SHARE who were mainly Salvadoran organizations rallied with the Nicaragua Network and other Nicaraguan organizations to speak out against the coup in Nicaragua at the time. Organizations like CISPES, the Salvadoran American National Association (SANA), Farabundo Martí National Liberation Front (FMLN), and others have been continuously working to establish transnational ties with El Salvador since the 1980s. Amid the 2004 Salvadoran presidential elections, the right-wing ARENA candidate Tony Sacas received backing from the U.S. Republican party. The Republican party threatened to prevent remittances sent for families in El Salvador from Salvadorans in the U.S. to arrive. In 2004 the number of remittances received to El Salvador was about $2 billion, as of 2017 it's more than $5 billion. In 2009, SANA reached out to Salvadoran organizations in Washington to aid in the call for the U.S. government to stay neutral amid the elections in El Salvador. This pressure from the large Salvadoran population in Washington and surrounding states, eventually even won the support of two congressmen, Howard Berman (D-California) and Raúl Grijalva (D-Arizona).

While the most ideologically committed of the Salvadoran refugees settled in Panama, Nicaragua, Costa Rica, Australia or Canada, those who settled in the United States focused on survival and building a community. Refugees who fled the government and refugees who fled the guerrillas have a lot in common; many will not even discuss their political beliefs, lest it disrupt the fragile solidarity of the refugee community. Furthermore, many Salvadorans on the left became active in politics because of the desperate poverty and class war in El Salvador; when they arrived in the United States, where it seemed for the first time possible to escape poverty through hard work, their political commitment sometimes melted away.

Salvadorans outside El Salvador are not permitted to cast absentee ballots in that country's elections. The majority of the refugee community is thought to favor the left, and the absence of their votes is believed to have helped the right-wing party ARENA win the Salvadoran presidency in 1989 and 1994.

The relative lack of political influence among Salvadoran Americans is not necessarily permanent. Salvadoran immigrants are densely concentrated in a few cities, and they have a strong infrastructure in refugee organizations. As more Salvadorans become U.S. citizens, the immigrant community will probably play a larger role in local and regional politics. And given their economic contribution, they will almost certainly come to exert more influence in El Salvador.

== El Salvador and United States relations ==
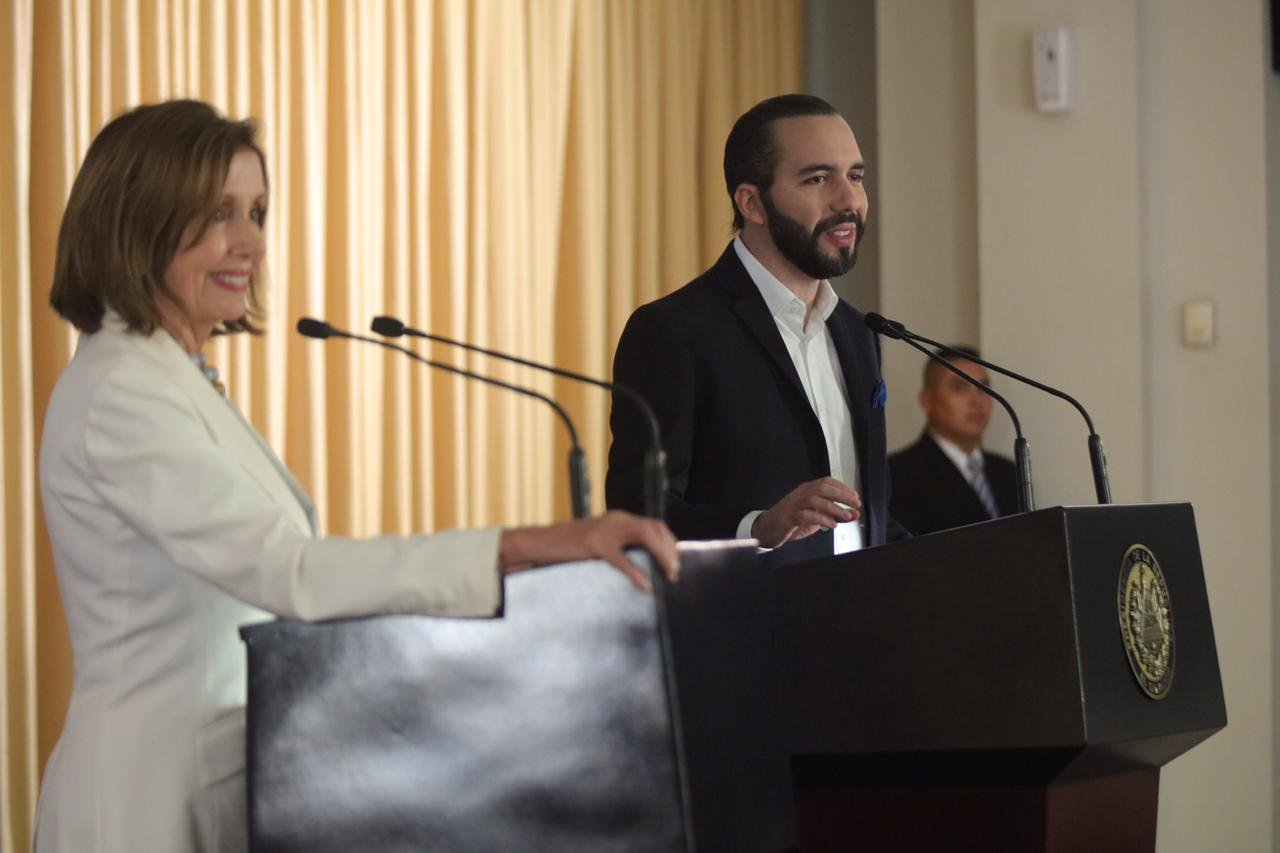
Speaker Nancy Pelosi meets with Salvadoran President Nayib Bukele on August 10, 2019

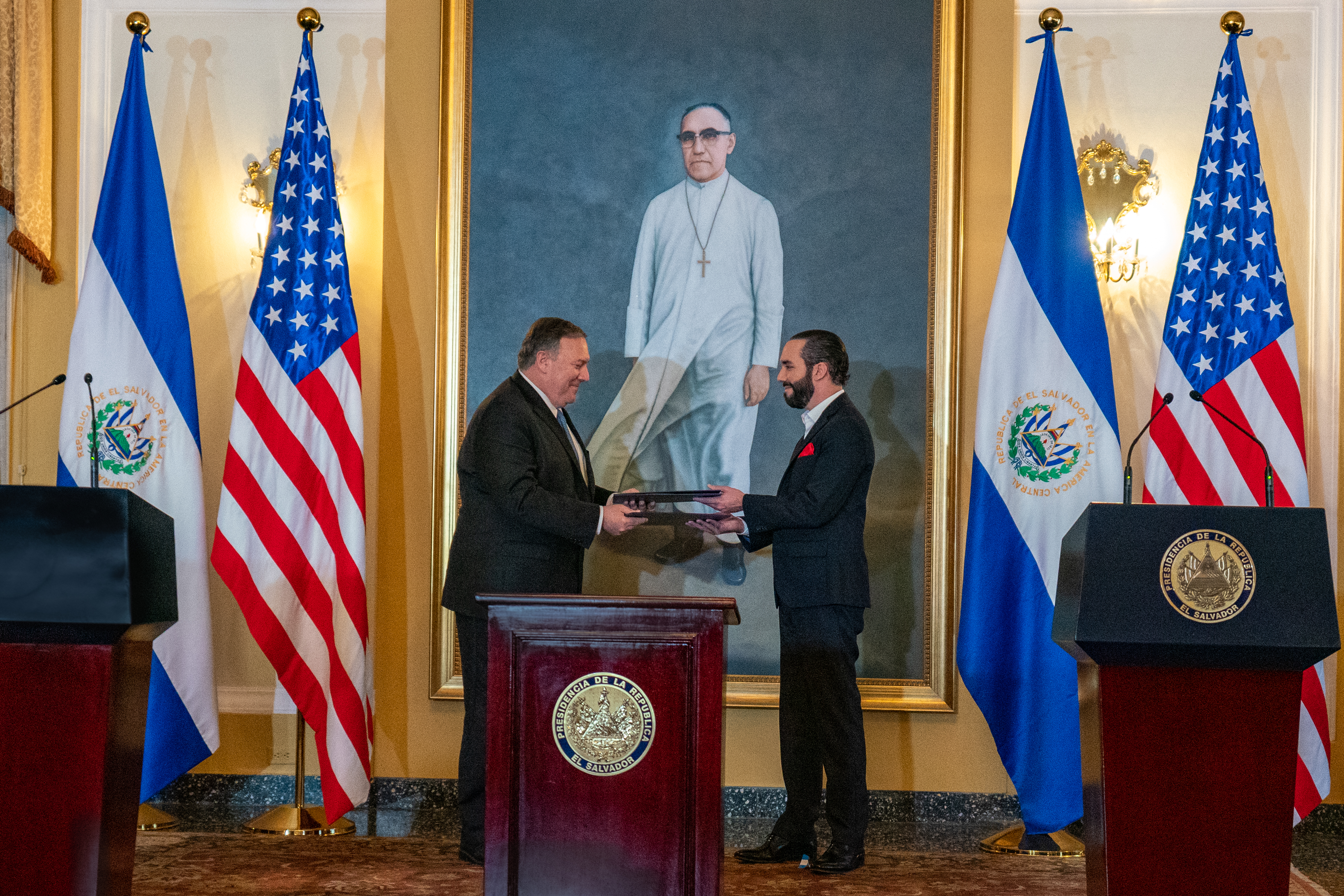
U.S. Secretary of State Mike Pompeo participates in a signing ceremony for the CSL Lease Extension with Salvadoran President Nayib Bukele, in San Salvador, El Salvador, July 21, 2019.

The history of U.S.-El Salvador relations encompasses some controversial moves and operations by the United States, e.g. the U.S.-involvement in the Salvadoran Civil War and interference in Salvadoran elections such as during the 2004 presidential election.

President Obama and President Funes announced the U.S.-El Salvador Partnership for Growth during President Obama's March 2011 visit to El Salvador. El Salvador is one of four countries—-along with the Philippines, Ghana and Tanzania—-with which the United States is undertaking this partnership. The Partnership began with an analysis by economic experts from both countries, which identified the two key binding constraints to growth in El Salvador as crime and insecurity, as well as low productivity in the tradables sector. Based on this assessment, the U.S. government worked closely with the Government of El Salvador to identify and prioritize key activities that would address those constraints to growth and unlock El Salvador's economic potential. The activities are outlined in a Joint Country Action Plan that will steer the partnership moving forward.

The recent 2009 elections resulted in the election of the leftist Farabundo Martí National Liberation Front (FMLN) party over the ARENA party that had been in power since 1992. ARENA supporters argued that the victory of FMLN would result in retaliation from the United States and lead to political reforms similar to those in Hugo Chávez's Venezuela despite the U.S. official neutral position. An Obama visit to El Salvador symbolized its acceptance of the new government and show to other Latin American countries that it will maintain strong ties despite the change of regime. The shift from ARENA to FMLN does symbolize the growing disenchantment of the Salvadoran population with Washington foreign policy.

Despite this shift, El Salvador has not decided to become more self-reliant. The economic development it experienced by following the Washington Consensus was worth the cost of economic reforms because it was able to access the American market and compete in the global market. Therefore, the Obama visit validated the stability within El Salvador in the transition from ARENA to FMLN and showed other countries in the region the benefits of following the Washington Consensus. Obama's visit was in order to strengthen America's position in Central America and show that countries that follow liberalization reforms enjoy stronger ties with the United States.

El Salvador's accommodation on economic and militia demand also meant that the United States would provide more benefits to Salvadorans living within the United States; Salvadorans have been eligible to receive TPS (Temporary Protection Status) since 1990. TPS has allowed Salvadorans to obtain work permits as well as protection from deportation. There are approximately 2 million Salvadorans live in the United States, making it the sixth largest ethnic group in the United States. Such a large number of Salvadorans means that they have the capacity to send money back to El Salvador, which would make a very large contribution to its economy. Salvadorans have been essential in rebuilding El Salvador's economy as shown in 2002 where it was reported that these migrants had sent $2 billion annually in remittances.

Remittances from the United States make El Salvador more dependent on the United States support for Salvadorans living there. Thus, it is imperative that El Salvador maintains strong political ties with the American government because of its dependence on remittances. Remittances account for twenty percent of El Salvador's Gross Domestic Product (GDP), which makes the economic ties with the United States even more important. Salvadorans who reside in the United States benefit as well from El Salvador's accommodation as exemplified by the American government's consistent extension of the TPS.

El Salvador has lobbied successfully for those extensions because of the strong ties that have been forged. United States-El Salvador relations have been a reciprocal relationship in which El Salvador has gained much more than if it were to have chosen a resistance strategy. Thus, President Obama's choice to stop in El Salvador exemplifies to the Salvadoran community in the United States that they have nothing to fear with the change of political parties.

The special relationship developed between the United States and El Salvador in the past 20 years has differentiated El Salvador from its neighboring Central American countries. Despite the high level of violence, El Salvador has transformed itself into a stable democracy and a success story in economic development.

U.S.-Salvadoran relations remain close and strong. U.S. policy towards the country promotes the strengthening of El Salvador's democratic institutions, rule of law, judicial reform, and civilian police; national reconciliation and reconstruction; and economic opportunity and growth. El Salvador has been a committed member of the coalition of nations fighting against terrorism and has sent 10 rotations of troops to Iraq to support Operation Iraqi Freedom.

On August 26, 2011, Ambassador Mari Carmen Aponte joined Salvadoran Minister of Defense David Munguía Payés in a formal send-off ceremony for 22 Salvadoran troops who will deploy to Afghanistan on August 28. The 22 troops will serve as instructor trainers within NATO Training Mission – Afghanistan (NTM-A). Specifically, 9 Air Force Trainers will work with the Afghan Air Units in Herat, 3 Military Police Trainers will work with the Afghan Police Academy in Kabul, and 10 Counter-Insurgency Instructors will operate throughout Afghanistan, training military and police units as part of 6 Mobile Training Teams.

Salvadoran troops have earned a reputation as an effective and professional military force for their participation in international humanitarian missions to Lebanon, Liberia, Côte d'Ivoire, Sudan and Haiti. El Salvador's Cuscatlán Battalion also served with distinction during 11 rotations in support of humanitarian and reconstruction activities in Iraq. This latest deployment will mark El Salvador's first participation in the NATO mission to Afghanistan.

U.S. ties to El Salvador are dynamic and growing. More than 19,000 American citizens live and work full-time in El Salvador. Most are private businesspersons and their families, but a small number of American citizen retirees have been drawn to El Salvador by favorable tax conditions. The Embassy's consular section provides a full range of citizenship services to this community. The American Chamber of Commerce in El Salvador is located at World Trade Center, Torre 2, local No. 308, 89 Av. Nte. Col. Escalón.

Principal U.S. officials include:

- Ambassador: William H. Duncan
- Deputy Chief of Mission: Robert Blau
- USAID Mission Chief—Deborah Kennedy-Iraheta
- Political Counselor—Maeve Dwyer
- Economic Counselor—Mitch Ferguson
- Commercial Officer—Michael McGee
- Public Affairs Officer—Marti Estell

The U.S. Embassy in El Salvador is located in Antiguo Cuscatlán.

== See also ==
- Salvadoran Mexicans
- Salvadoran Australians
- History of the Central Americans in Houston
- El Salvador–United States relations
- Salvadoran diaspora in Los Angeles
