= Angelica Garcia =

Angelica Garcia may refer to:

- Angelica (singer) (born Angelica Garcia, in 1972), American former Latin pop singer
- Angélica Garcia (singer), American singer-songwriter
- Angélica García Arrieta, Mexican politician
