= Angélica Garcia (singer) =

American singer-songwriter

- Born: Los Angeles, California, U.S.
- Occupation: Singer
- Years active: 2016–present
- Musical career
- Genres: Pop; jazz; indie
- Labels: Spacebomb; Partisan
- Website: https://www.angelicagarciamusic.net/

Angélica Garcia is an American singer-songwriter based in Richmond, Virginia. She has released three studio albums, and her song "Jícama" became widely known when Barack Obama selected the track for his 2019 year-end list.

== Early life and education ==
Angélica Garcia was born in Los Angeles, California and raised in El Monte in the San Gabriel Valley east of Los Angeles. Garcia's mother, who is of Mexican and Salvadoran descent, was a freestyle musician who performed under the mononym Angelica and scored a top-40 hit on the Billboard Hot 100 with her cover of the Rosie and the Originals's song, "Angel Baby". She studied creative writing at Cooperative Arts High in New Haven, Connecticut, then returned to Southern California and graduated from the Los Angeles County High School for the Arts where she studied vocal jazz and sang at the Monterey Jazz Festival in Monterey, California. When she was 17, Garcia's family moved to Accomac, Virginia, before she moved on her own to Richmond.

== Career ==
In 2022, her record Echo Eléctrico was included on the shortlist for the inaugural Newlin Music Prize in Richmond, VA.

Garcia appears in the racing video game Forza Horizon 5 as the DJ of the in-game rock-oriented radio station Horizon XS, which includes her song "Karma the Knife" from Cha Cha Palace in its soundtrack.

== Discography ==
=== Studio albums ===
- Medicine for Birds (2016)
- Cha Cha Palace (2020)
- Gemelo (2024)

=== Extended plays ===
- The Big Machine EP (2018)
- Echo Eléctrico (2021)
