= New Carrollton, Maryland =

City in Maryland, United States

- City
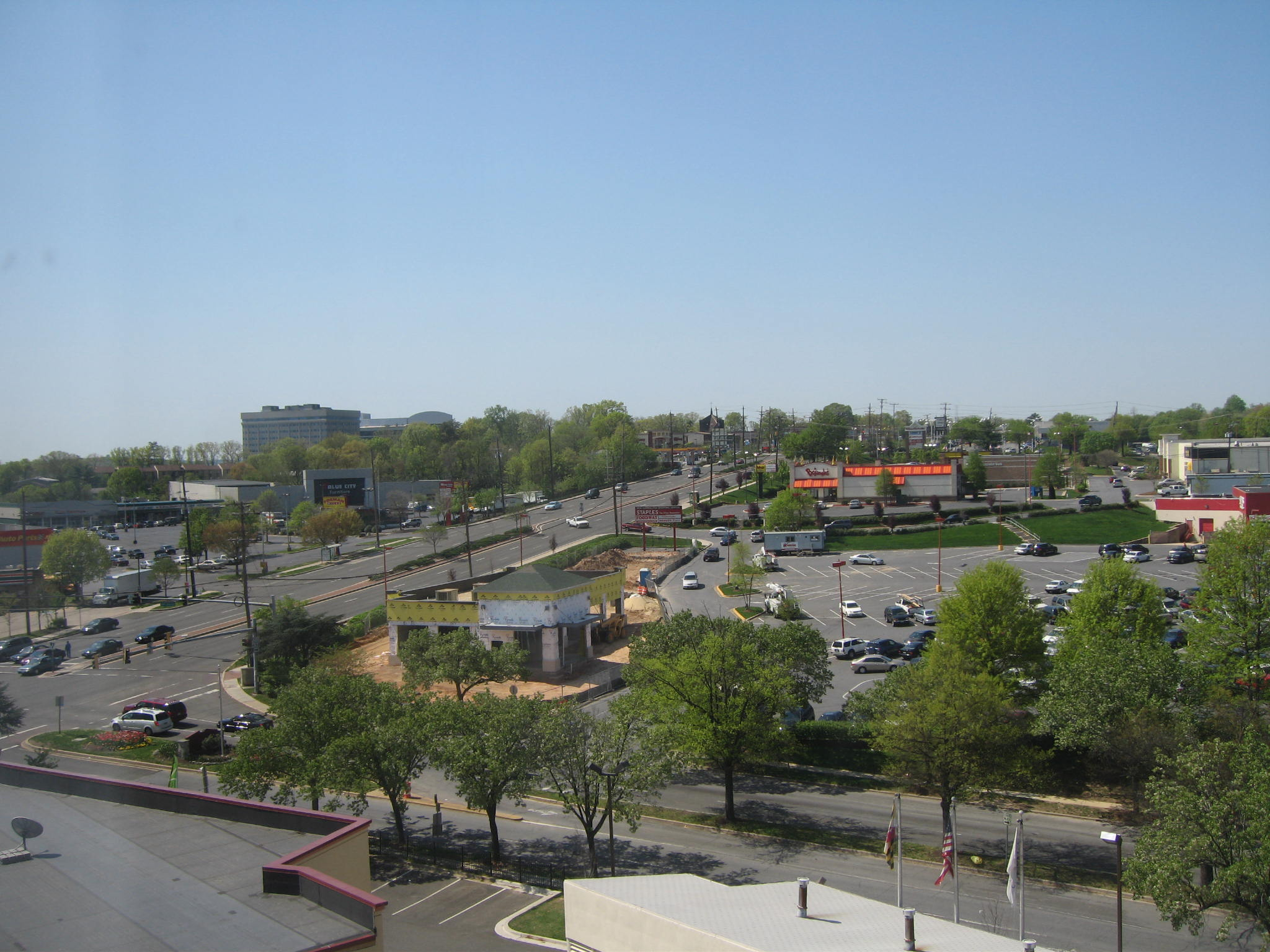
- Downtown New Carrollton's Annapolis Road in March 2010

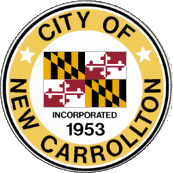
- Flag Seal

- Location of New Carrollton, Maryland
- Coordinates: 38°57′59″N 76°52′36″W
- Country: United States of America
- State: Maryland
- County: Prince George's
- Incorporated: April 11, 1953

Government
  - Mayor: Phelecia E. Nembhard

Area
  - Total: 1.56 sq mi (4.05 km^{2})
  - Land: 1.56 sq mi (4.05 km^{2})
  - Water: 0 sq mi (0.00 km^{2})
- Elevation: 79 ft (24 m)

Population (2020)
  - Total: 13,715
  - Density: 8,760.4/sq mi (3,382.41/km^{2})
- Time zone: UTC−5 (Eastern (EST))
  - Summer (DST): UTC−4 (EDT)
- ZIP Code: 20784
- Area codes: 301, 240
- FIPS code: 24-55400
- GNIS feature ID: 0597805
- Website: www.newcarrolltonmd.gov

New Carrollton is a city in central Prince George's County, Maryland, 10 miles (16 km) east of Washington, D.C. According to the 2020 census, the population was 13,715.

== History ==
Developer Albert W. Turner acquired the former estate of horse racing figure Edward L. Mahoney after Mahoney's death in 1957 and transformed it into a planned suburb. Turner had secured a charter for the City of Carrollton from the Maryland General Assembly on April 11, 1953. He named the community after Charles Carroll of Carrollton, an early Maryland settler and the last surviving signatory of the Declaration of Independence.

Since two other Maryland communities also carried the name Carrollton, voters approved renaming the city to New Carrollton in a referendum on May 2, 1966.

== Adjacent Areas ==
- Landover Hills (southwest)
- Woodlawn (southwest)
- East Riverdale (west)
- Greenbelt (north)
- Seabrook (northeast)
- Lanham (east)

== Education ==
=== Primary and secondary schools ===
New Carrollton is served by the Prince George's County Public Schools. Portions of New Carrollton are zoned to the following elementary schools:

- Carrollton Elementary School (8300 Quintana Street)
- Robert Frost Elementary School (6419 85th Avenue)
- Lamont Elementary School (7101 Good Luck Road)
- Glenridge Elementary School (7200 Gallatin Street)
- James McHenry Elementary School

Most residents attend Charles Carroll Middle School (6130 Lamont Drive), while some are zoned to Thomas Johnson Middle School. Similarly, most high school students attend Parkdale High School (6001 Good Luck Road), with some zoned to DuVal High School.

Margaret Brent Regional Center (5816 Lamont Terrace), a school for children with special needs, is also located in New Carrollton.

=== Public Libraries ===
The Prince George's County Memorial Library System operates the New Carrollton Library.

== Geography ==
New Carrollton is located at 38°57′59″N 76°52′36″W (38.966360, -76.876643).

According to the United States Census Bureau, the city has a total area of 1.53 square miles (3.96 km^{2}), all land.

== Transportation ==
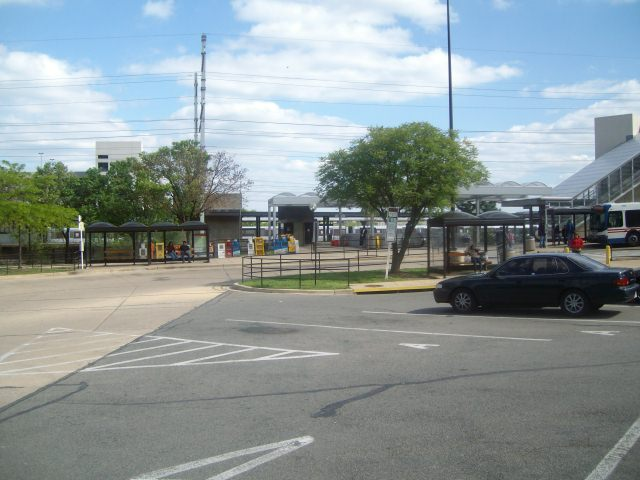
The New Carrollton station in April 2010, located off MD 450.

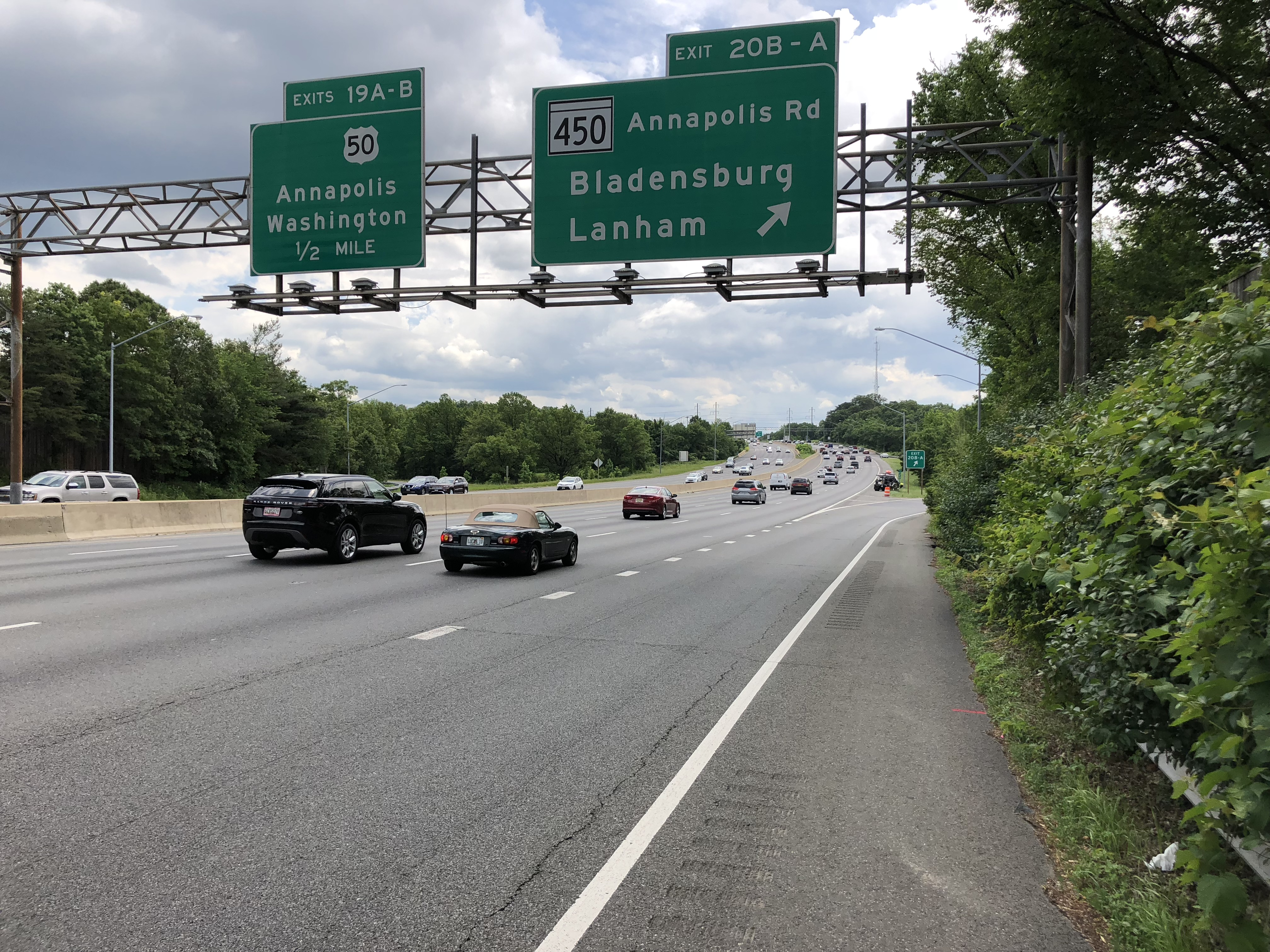
I-95/I-495 southbound in New Carrollton in May 2019

=== Roads and highways ===
Interstate 95/Interstate 495 (the Capital Beltway) primarily serves New Carrollton. I-495 encircles Washington, D.C., connecting the city to its surrounding suburbs. I-95 follows only the eastern section of the Beltway, diverging near both its northern and southern ends.

To the north, I-95 runs through Baltimore, Philadelphia, New York City, and Boston before reaching Canada. To the south, it passes through Richmond on its way to Florida. Maryland Route 450 provides direct access to New Carrollton, while Maryland Route 410 and Maryland Route 433 also serve the area.

=== Public transportation ===
The New Carrollton station sits just outside the city's southern limits. It serves as the first Amtrak station on the Northeast Corridor north of Washington Union Station. The Penn Line of the MARC commuter rail also stops there. The adjacent New Carrollton station of the Washington Metro is the eastern terminus of the Orange Line.

== Demographics ==
Historical population
Census	Pop.	Note	%±
1960	3,385		—
1970	14,870		339.3%
1980	12,632		−15.1%
1990	12,002		−5.0%
2000	12,589		4.9%
2010	12,135		−3.6%
2020	13,715		13.0%
U.S. Decennial Census; 2010 2020

=== Racial and ethnic composition ===
New Carrollton city, Maryland – Racial and ethnic composition Note: the US Census treats Hispanic/Latino as an ethnic category. This table excludes Latinos from the racial categories and assigns them to a separate category. Hispanics/Latinos may be of any race.
Race / Ethnicity (NH = Non-Hispanic)	Pop 2000	Pop 2010	Pop 2020	% 2000	% 2010	% 2020
White alone (NH)	2,452	1,139	720	19.48%	9.39%	5.25%
Black or African American alone (NH)	8,416	7,054	7,141	66.85%	58.13%	52.07%
Native American or Alaska Native alone (NH)	18	12	21	0.14%	0.10%	0.15%
Asian alone (NH)	605	506	419	4.81%	4.17%	3.06%
Native Hawaiian or Pacific Islander alone (NH)	3	3	6	0.02%	0.02%	0.04%
Other race alone (NH)	19	49	112	0.15%	0.40%	0.82%
Mixed race or Multiracial (NH)	249	165	329	1.98%	1.36%	2.40%
Hispanic or Latino (any race)	827	3,207	4,967	6.57%	26.43%	36.22%
Total	12,589	12,135	13,715	100.00%	100.00%	100.00%

=== 2020 census ===
As of the 2020 census, New Carrollton had a population of 13,715. The median age was 35.3 years. 24.5% of residents were under the age of 18 and 11.3% of residents were 65 years of age or older. For every 100 females, there were 96.2 males, and for every 100 females age 18 and over, there were 93.3 males age 18 and over.

100.0% of residents lived in urban areas, while 0.0% lived in rural areas.

There were 4,413 households in New Carrollton, of which 38.3% had children under the age of 18 living in them. Of all households, 38.5% were married-couple households, 21.2% were households with a male householder and no spouse or partner present, and 34.4% were households with a female householder and no spouse or partner present. About 28.4% of all households were made up of individuals and 8.9% had someone living alone who was 65 years of age or older.

There were 4,603 housing units, of which 4.1% were vacant. The homeowner vacancy rate was 1.0% and the rental vacancy rate was 4.6%.

=== 2010 census ===
As of the census of 2010, there were 12,135 people, 3,952 households, and 2,688 families living in the city. The population density was 7,931.4 inhabitants per square mile (3,062.3/km^{2}). There were 4,256 housing units at an average density of 2,781.7 per square mile (1,074.0/km^{2}). The racial makeup of the city was 15.2% White, 59.5% African American, 0.6% Native American, 4.2% Asian, 17.8% from other races, and 2.6% from two or more races. Hispanic or Latino of any race were 26.4% of the population.

There were 3,952 households, of which 39.6% had children under the age of 18 living with them, 40.4% were married couples living together, 21.0% had a female householder with no husband present, 6.7% had a male householder with no wife present, and 32.0% were non-families. 25.4% of all households were made up of individuals, and 5.5% had someone living alone who was 65 years of age or older. The average household size was 3.07 and the average family size was 3.66.

The median age in the city was 33 years. 26.2% of residents were under the age of 18; 10% were between the ages of 18 and 24; 30.7% were from 25 to 44; 24.8% were from 45 to 64; and 8.2% were 65 years of age or older. The gender makeup of the city was 48.8% male and 51.2% female.

=== 2000 census ===
As of the census of 2000, there were 12,589 people, 4,568 households, and 3,074 families living in the city. The population density was 8,288.5 inhabitants per square mile (3,200.2/km^{2}). There were 4,749 housing units at an average density of 3,126.7 per square mile (1,207.2/km^{2}). The racial makeup of the city was 21.81% White, 67.50% African American, 0.24% Native American, 4.81% Asian, 0.06% Pacific Islander, 3.10% from other races, and 2.48% from two or more races. Hispanic or Latino of any race were 6.57% of the population.

There were 4,568 households, out of which 34.8% had children under the age of 18 living with them, 40.6% were married couples living together, 20.7% had a female householder with no husband present, and 32.7% were non-families. 25.7% of all households were made up of individuals, and 4.4% had someone living alone who was 65 years of age or older. The average household size was 2.75 and the average family size was 3.34.

In the city, the population was spread out, with 27.9% under the age of 18, 9.6% from 18 to 24, 33.6% from 25 to 44, 21.3% from 45 to 64, and 7.6% who were 65 years of age or older. The median age was 33 years. For every 100 females, there were 93.7 males. For every 100 females age 18 and over, there were 89.5 males.

The median income for a household in the city was $51,930, and the median income for a family was $56,696. Males had a median income of $35,438 versus $35,599 for females. The per capita income for the city was $21,654. About 5.9% of families and 7.1% of the population were below the poverty line, including 7.5% of those under age 18 and 4.1% of those age 65 or over.

== Government ==
Phelecia E. Nembhard serves as the Mayor of New Carrollton. Re-elected in 2025 for a second term, she also served from 2020 to 2023, when she made history as the City’s first Black mayor and first woman to hold the position.

The New Carrollton Police Department leads law enforcement efforts in the city. The Prince George's County Police Department District 1 Station in Hyattsville and District 2 Station in Brock Hall CDP, along with the Prince George's County Sheriff's Office and Maryland State Police assist in serving the community.
