= Cha Cha Palace =

Studio album by Angélica Garcia
- Released: February 28, 2020
- Genre: Art pop
- Length: 45:11
- Label: Spacebomb
- Producer: Eddie Prendergast

Angélica Garcia chronology
Medicine for Birds (2016)	Cha Cha Palace (2020)	Gemelo (2024)

Singles from Cha Cha Palace
- 1. "Guadalupe" Released: January 17, 2020

Cha Cha Palace is the second studio album by American singer-songwriter Angélica Garcia. It was released on February 28, 2020, following the inclusion of the track "Jícama" on Barack Obama's year-end music list in 2019. Its lead single was "Guadalupe".

== Background ==
Following the release of her debut album Medicine for Birds, Garcia began to shift her sound to reflect her Salva-Mexican-American identity. In his annual best-of year end music list, Barack Obama featured Garcia's "Jícama". This led to significant buzz surrounding Garcia's second album. On January 20, 2020, Garcia announced that her second album would be titled Cha Cha Palace, releasing its first single "Guadalupe".

== Production ==
Cha Cha Palace was recorded in Richmond, Virginia, and produced by Eddie Prendergast. Garcia collaborated on the album art and design with Marissa Alper, who took the album's cover photo, and Mariela Gavino.

== Reception ==
Professional ratings
Review scores
Source	Rating
AllMusic	4.5/5 stars
Evening Standard	4/5 stars

Cha Cha Palace received positive reviews from critics upon its release. DIY gave the album four and a half stars out of five, while the Evening Standard gave the album four out of five stars stating "Garcia has embraced her roots and hit upon an eclectic style all her own. It's a fusion fit for a president." Style magazine stated that Cha Cha Palace is "a convincing, grand scale, heartfelt and humorous romp through the haunted borderlands between cultures."

== Track listing ==
All songs written by Angélica Garcia, except where noted.

1. "I Don't Believe in Death" – 1:44
2. "Karma the Knife" – 3:38
3. "Jícama" – 1:25
4. "It Don't Hinder Me" – 4:19
5. "La Enorme Distancia" (Garcia, José Alfredo Jiménez) – 1:50
6. "Guadalupe" – 3:09
7. "Lucifer Waiting" – 4:30
8. "La Llorona" (trad., Garcia) – 0.53
9. "Valentina in the Moonlight" – 4:23
10. "Agua de Rosa" – 3:36
11. "Penny in My Back Pocket" – 3:42
12. "Jícama Pt. Dos" – 2:31
13. "The Big Machine" – 6:44
