= Rosie Hamlin =

American singer (1945–2017)

- Hamlin c. early 1960s

Background information
- Born: Rosalie Méndez Hamlin; July 21, 1945; Klamath Falls, Oregon, U.S.
- Died: March 30, 2017 (aged 71) Belen, New Mexico, U.S.
- Genres: Rock and roll; doo-wop; R&B
- Occupations: Singer; songwriter
- Years active: 1960–1977; 2002
- Formerly of: Rosie and the Originals

Rosalie "Rosie" Méndez Hamlin (July 21, 1945 – March 30, 2017)was an Mexican American singer and songwriter who was the frontwoman of Rosie and the Originals. The group is best known for the 1960 song "Angel Baby", which became a Top 40 hit in 1961 when Hamlin was only 15 years old. She married guitarist Noah Tafolla, and they had two children (Joseph and Deborah) before they divorced. Hamlin had a third child (John) several years later. Hamlin continued to perform including performing at several revival concerts until 2002, before retiring from live performances due to advanced fibromyalgia.

Hamlin's "Angel Baby" was covered by several artists, including Linda Ronstadt and John Lennon, who cited Hamlin as one of his favorite singers. She was the first Latina to be honored by the Rock and Roll Hall of Fame, as well as the first Latina to appear on Dick Clark's American Bandstand in 1961.

== Early life ==
Rosalie "Rosie" Méndez Hamlin was born in Klamath Falls, Oregon, on July 21, 1945, to Ofelia Juana Méndez and Harry Hamlin (not to be confused with the actor of the same name). Her mother was Mexican, and her father was of Anglo-American ancestry. She spent part of her childhood between Anchorage, Alaska, and California, before her family moved to National City, California. Hamlin came from a musical family; her father and grandfather were both musicians who had backgrounds in vaudeville.

Hamlin began singing with a band at 13. She wrote the lyrics for "Angel Baby" as a poem for "[her] very first boyfriend" when she was 14 years old, still attending Mission Bay High School in San Diego, California. During her childhood, Hamlin was trained to play piano.

According to her personal autobiography she said "I was born Rosalie Hamlin on July 21, 1945 in Klamath Falls, Oregon. I attended Denali Elementary School in Anchorage, Alaska and Ira Harbison Elementary in National City, California. I then attended Granger Jr. High and O'Farrell Jr. High, SweetWater High in National City, and Mission Bay High in San Diego. Because I was always traveling, I had a tutor and didn't graduate in regular fashion. My home life growing up in Alaska was a lot of fun. We always seemed to be swimming or doing something water related. I always enjoyed horseback riding, ice skating, skiing, mountain climbing, fishing and target practicing."

== Career ==
At age 15, Hamlin and some friends rented the only recording studio they could find within 100 miles of San Diego to record the song. Located in San Marcos, California, the studio was owned by an airplane mechanic who had taken part of his hangar to create it. After taking the master to a Kresge's department store in downtown San Diego, they convinced a manager to play it in the listening booth of the store's music department. The song received positive reactions from teenage listeners, and a scout from Highland Records offered the group a recording contract, under the condition that the company take possession of the master recording, and that David Ponce be named as the author of the song, as he was the eldest member of the group. Hamlin along with her band performed six shows with Jackie Wilson at the Brooklyn Paramount Theatre in New York City in late 1960.

"Angel Baby", which featured Hamlin's noted soprano vocals, made its radio debut in November 1960, before the group had even received their contract; the track was also played on K-Day Radio from disc jockey Alan Freed. When the group formally established a contract, Hamlin found that she was ineligible to collect record royalties from the song because she was not listed as the songwriter. This led to the group's break-up, and although Hamlin secured the copyright to her music in 1961, decades of battles over royalties followed. "Angel Baby" charted at number 5 on the Billboard Singles Chart. On March 30, 1961, Hamlin appeared with Rosie and the Originals on Dick Clark's American Bandstand, performing "Lonely Blue Nights", making her the first Latina to appear on the series.

In 2001, Hamlin released Angel Baby Revisited, which features original recordings and other performances, as well as a Spanglish version of "Angel Baby," which featured lyrics that alternate between English and Spanish. She would perform revival shows in 2002, including performances at Madison Square Garden, before formally retiring from performing due to advanced fibromyalgia.

== Personal life ==
Hamlin formally retired from the music industry in 1963 after her marriage to Originals guitarist Noah Tafolla. The couple had two children, Joey and Deborah (b. 1964) and would eventually divorce.Noah Tafolla died on September 9, 2019, aged 76. Hamlin had another child named John many years later.

== Death ==
Hamlin died in her sleep of undisclosed causes on March 30, 2017, at her home in New Mexico. Her family confirmed she had suffered health problems in the course of her later life which prevented her from performing live.

== Legacy ==
Hamlin's track "Angel Baby" was cited by John Lennon as one of his favorite songs, and he covered the track in 1975. She was the first Latina to be honored by the Rock and Roll Hall of Fame, on their Wall of One-Hit Wonders. In July 2007, a concert honoring Hamlin was held at the Pearson Park Amphitheater in Anaheim, California.

In November 2025, cleaned up stereo mixes of "Angel Baby" and "Lonely Blue Nights" were released for the first time in stereo and included on the 2025 compilation titled Rosie Forever!.Both were released as part of a new 2025 compilation album titled Rosie Forever!.In June 2026, weeks prior to what would have been Hamlin's eighty-first birthday, Hamlin's estate released a brand new stereo mixes of "Angel Baby" and "My Darling Forever".
