= Angel Baby (Rosie and the Originals song) =

1960 single by Rosie and the Originals

- Original 7-inch

Single by Rosie and the Originals
- B-side: "Give Me Love"
- Released: 1960
- Recorded: 1960
- Genre: Rock and roll; doo-wop
- Length: 3:43
- Label: Highland
- Songwriter: Rosie Hamlin (some prints credit David Ponci as the songwriter)
- Excerpt from Angel Baby Performed by Rosie & The Originals

"Angel Baby" is a 1960 single by Rosie and the Originals. The group recorded the song independently on a two-track machine, located in a facility in the small farming community of San Marcos, California. At the time, lead singer Rosie Hamlin was only 15 years old. She had written the lyrics for "Angel Baby" as a poem for "[her] very first boyfriend" when she was a 14-year-old student at Mission Bay High School in San Diego, California.

Initially unable to find a label willing to distribute the song because of its unpolished sound, the group convinced a San Diego department store to pipe their master through the listening booths in the record department. The response from listeners prompted Highland Records to sign the band and promote the single. Since its release the song has become an oldies standard.

== Rosie & the Originals ==
The song debuted on the Billboard Hot 100 in December 1960 and remained on the charts for 13 weeks, reaching No. 5 on January 28, 1961. On the R&B charts, "Angel Baby" also peaked at #5 and remained on that chart for eight weeks. In 1961, "Angel Baby" was also released in Canada (#3) on the Zirkon label and in Australia and England on London Records. The British release slightly edited the intro.

Rosie & the Originals later re-recorded a Spanglish version of "Angel Baby", which appears on the UK compilations The Best of Rosie & the Originals (1999) and Angel Baby Revisited (2002). In 2018, this recording appeared in an El Pollo Loco commercial.

In November 2025, a cleaned up stereo mix of "Angel Baby" was released for the first time in stereo and included on the 2025 compilation titled Rosie Forever!.The song was released as part of a new 2025 compilation album titled Rosie Forever!.In June 2026, weeks prior to what would have been Hamlin's eighty-first birthday, Hamlin's estate released a brand new stereo 2026 mix of "Angel Baby".

== John Lennon ==
John Lennon recorded a version of the song in 1973, eventually released on the 1986 album Menlove Ave. and later, on the 1990 box set Lennon. A remixed version was released in 2004 as a bonus track on a reissue of Lennon's 1975 Rock 'n' Roll album. In the intro, Lennon calls it one of his favorite songs and says, "send my love to Rosie, wherever she may be." Rosie called it her favorite cover of the song. Circulating tapes of Lennon's 1971 birthday party also include a busked version of the song.

== Other versions ==
- Several versions of the song were released in 1961, including one by Kathy Young, who included it on her album The Sound Of Kathy Young.
- Soul singer Charles Brown released the song on a King Records single in 1961
- Girl group Reparata and the Delrons included the song on their 1970 album, Rock 'n' Roll Revolution.
- Japanese avant garde art pop icon Jun Togawa recorded a version in 1985, on her best selling album Suki Suki Daisuki.
- A reggae version was released by Shehene & the Knobs on a single in 1987.
- In 1991, singer Angelica released an album with the song as the title track. Released as a single, Angelica scored a No. 29 hit on the Billboard Hot 100.
- The song was covered by actor Wong Chi-zan in a scene for the 1991 Taiwanese film A Brighter Summer Day.
- Jeanette Jurado also did a cover that was featured in the 1995 feature film My Family.
- Linda Ronstadt recorded a version for her 1996 album of lullabies, Dedicated to the One I Love.
- In 2001 singer Jenni Rivera released a version of the song on her album, Se Las Voy A Dar A Otro.
- In 2001, Texas rocker Roky Erickson and his band The Aliens, recorded a version of the song on the album Don't Knock The Rock
- Yolanda Perez released a version in a mix of English and Spanish on her 2002 album La Potranquita con Banda
- Pop singer Tiffany included the song on her 2005 album Dreams Never Die
- Black Rebel Motorcycle Club did a cover of this song as an iTunes bonus track on for their 2013 album Specter At The Feast.
- System of a Down covered the song live as part of their sole U.S. tour date of 2013 at the Hollywood Bowl in Los Angeles on July 29, 2013.
- Miguel Matute Project recorded a version in 2019 with Liana Ochoa on vocals, included in the album Desde Adentro y Otros Asuntos.
- "Incelcore" artist, School Shooter recorded a cover of the song in 2017. Featured on his album "TRASH".
