= Leon Brown (American football) =

American football player (born 1993)

Profile
- Position: Tackle

Personal information
- Born: February 24, 1993 (age 33); Riverdale Park, Maryland, U.S.
- Listed height: 6 ft 6 in (1.98 m)
- Listed weight: 313 lb (142 kg)

Career information
- High school: Parkdale (Riverdale Park)
- College: Alabama
- NFL draft: 2015: undrafted

Career history
- Baltimore Ravens (2015–2016)*; Baltimore Brigade (2017)*; Birmingham Iron (2019); Frisco Fighters (2023); San Diego Strike Force (2024)*; Minnesota Monsters (2026)*
- * Offseason or practice squad member only

Leon Brown (born February 24, 1993) is an American professional football tackle. He was signed as an undrafted free agent by the Baltimore Ravens after the 2015 NFL draft. He played college football for the Alabama Crimson Tide.

== Professional career ==
=== Baltimore Ravens ===
On May 12, 2015, Brown signed to the Baltimore Ravens. On August 31, 2015, he was cut.

On December 30, 2015, Brown signed to the Ravens' practice squad. On January 5, 2016, Brown signed a reserve/future contract. On May 12, 2016, he was released.

=== Baltimore Brigade ===
On January 16, 2017, it was announced that Brown was among the first five players signed to the Baltimore Brigade of the Arena Football League. On May 8, 2017, Brown was placed on reassignment. Brown was assigned to the Brigade once again on May 11, 2017. On May 25, 2017, Brown was placed on recallable reassignment.

=== Birmingham Iron ===
On November 9, 2018, Brown signed with the Birmingham Iron of the Alliance of American Football (AAF) for the 2019 season.

=== Frisco Fighters ===
On December 20, 2022, Brown signed with the Frisco Fighters of the Indoor Football League (IFL).

=== San Diego Strike Force ===
On October 16, 2023, Brown was traded to the San Diego Strike Force.

=== Minnesota Monsters ===
On April 22, 2026, Brown was signed by the Minnesota Monsters of the Arena Football One (AF1).
