= Angelica (singer) =

Latin pop singer (born 1972)

Angelica Garcia (born May 21, 1972, in East Los Angeles, California) is a former Latin pop singer.

== Early life ==
Her uncle was Eusebio Garcia, director of Mariachi Toluca in Mexico. In 2021, Garcia obtained a bachelor's degree in Applied Design and Photography from the University of Maryland Eastern Shore, and in 2023 a Master of Fine Arts from the Institute of American Indian Arts in Santa Fe, New Mexico. Angelica is now a multi-disciplinary artist based in Long Beach, CA. She is the mother of singer-songwriter Angélica Garcia.

== Career ==
She won the "Best New Artist" award at the Mexican national contest, Juguemos a Cantar, and spent two years singing and acting on the variety program La Hora Feliz. The title track of her debut album, Angel Baby (a cover of a Rosie and the Originals song), was a hit in America, peaking on the Billboard Hot 100 in 1991 at No. 29. She never had another US hit, but her 1997 Spanish-language single "Vaya" was a hit in Central and South America.

== Discography ==
=== Albums ===
- Angel Baby (1991) US Billboard Heatseekers peak No. 37
- Angelica (1997)
