= Gemelo =

Studio album by Angélica Garcia
- Released: June 7, 2024
- Genre: Dance
- Length: 33:26
- Language: Spanish; English
- Label: Partisan
- Producer: Carlos Arévalo

Angélica Garcia chronology
Cha Cha Palace (2020)	Gemelo (2024)

Gemelo (transl. "Twin") is the third studio album by American singer-songwriter Angélica Garcia, released on June 7, 2024, through Partisan Records. In contrast to Garcia's previous work, the album is almost entirely sung in Spanish. It was produced by Carlos Arévalo of the band Chicano Batman, and received positive reviews from critics.

== Critical reception ==
Professional ratings
Aggregate scores
Source	Rating
Metacritic	86/100
Review scores
Source	Rating
AllMusic	4/5 stars
Clash	8/10
Paste	8.2/10
Spin	A−

Gemelo received a score of 86 out of 100 on review aggregator Metacritic based on four critics' reviews, which the website categorized as "universal acclaim". AllMusic's Matt Collar called it "an album of pearlescent and kaleidoscopic dance anthems" and "sleek, built around pulsing synths, and spiraling electronic and analog percussion". Suzy Exposito of Spin described Gemelo as "a spiritual thriller in song" as well as "a heady electro-opera, following Garcia as she breaks bread with her more ethereal side, the soul to her body".

Eric R. Danton of Paste found the "first half is more introspective on songs about self-exploration and a search for meaning" while the latter half is "the catharsis, when Garcia lets fly with a restless, compelling energy that she channels into bolder sounds". Reviewing the album for Clash, Julia Mason concluded that it is "an album to be listened to in its entirety to fully appreciate the range and intensity Angelica brings to her creativity" with themes that "touch us all. Such is the ability of Angélica to articulate herself through her songs, you don't have to understand Spanish to appreciate this powerfully emotive album".

== Track listing ==
Gemelo track listing
No.	Title	Length
1.	"Reflexiones"	1:50
2.	"Color de Dolor"	3:16
3.	"Juanita"	3:46
4.	"Ángel (Eterna)"	4:17
5.	"Mírame"	3:21
6.	"Y Grito"	1:33
7.	"El Que"	5:25
8.	"Intuición"	3:13
9.	"Gemini"	3:14
10.	"Paloma"	3:31
Total length:		33:26
