= Woodlawn, Prince George's County, Maryland =

Woodlawn, Maryland
- Census-designated place
- Location of Woodlawn, Maryland
- Coordinates: 38°56′58″N 76°53′53″W
- Country: United States
- State: Maryland
- County: Prince George's

Area
  - Total: 1.15 sq mi (2.97 km^{2})
  - Land: 1.14 sq mi (2.96 km^{2})
  - Water: 0.0039 sq mi (0.01 km^{2})

Population (2020)
  - Total: 7,541
  - Density: 6,588.3/sq mi (2,543.77/km^{2})
- Time zone: UTC−5 (Eastern (EST))
  - Summer (DST): UTC−4 (EDT)
- Area code: 301/240
- FIPS code: 24-86525
- GNIS feature ID: 598276

Woodlawn is an unincorporated area and census-designated place (CDP) in Prince George's County, Maryland, United States. As of the 2020 census it had a population of 7,541.

== Geography ==
Woodlawn is located at 38°56′58″N 76°53′53″W (38.949361, −76.898016).

According to the United States Census Bureau, the community has a total area of 1.1 square miles (2.9 km^{2}), all land.

== Demographics ==
Historical population
Census	Pop.	Note	%±
1980	5,306		—
1990	5,329		0.4%
2000	6,251		17.3%
2010	6,334		1.3%
2020	7,541		19.1%
U.S. Decennial Census; 2010 2020

=== Racial and ethnic composition ===
Woodlawn CDP (Prince George's County), Maryland – Racial and ethnic composition Note: the US Census treats Hispanic/Latino as an ethnic category. This table excludes Latinos from the racial categories and assigns them to a separate category. Hispanics/Latinos may be of any race.
Race / Ethnicity (NH = Non-Hispanic)	Pop 2000	Pop 2010	Pop 2020	% 2000	% 2010	% 2020
White alone (NH)	917	449	306	14.67%	7.09%	4.06%
Black or African American alone (NH)	4,461	3,002	2,519	71.36%	47.40%	33.40%
Native American or Alaska Native alone (NH)	24	29	11	0.38%	0.46%	0.15%
Asian alone (NH)	138	101	182	2.21%	1.59%	2.41%
Native Hawaiian or Pacific Islander alone (NH)	2	7	0	0.03%	0.11%	0.00%
Other race alone (NH)	17	23	44	0.27%	0.36%	0.58%
Mixed race or Multiracial (NH)	95	76	168	1.52%	1.20%	2.23%
Hispanic or Latino (any race)	597	2,647	4,311	9.55%	41.79%	57.17%
Total	6,251	6,334	7,541	100.00%	100.00%	100.00%

=== 2000 Census ===
As of the census of 2000, there were 6,251 people, 2,068 households, and 1,565 families residing in the community. The population density was 5,638.1 inhabitants per square mile (2,176.9/km^{2}). There were 2,183 housing units at an average density of 1,968.9 per square mile (760.2/km^{2}). The racial makeup of the community was 17.45% White, 72.34% African American, 0.38% Native American, 2.21% Asian, 0.10% Pacific Islander, 4.86% from other races, and 2.66% from two or more races. Hispanic or Latino of any race were 9.55% of the population.

There were 2,068 households, out of which 38.6% had children under the age of 18 living with them, 45.3% were married couples living together, 22.8% had a female householder with no husband present, and 24.3% were non-families. 19.5% of all households were made up of individuals, and 5.9% had someone living alone who was 65 years of age or older. The average household size was 3.02 and the average family size was 3.45.

In the community the population was spread out, with 29.7% under the age of 18, 9.2% from 18 to 24, 31.2% from 25 to 44, 22.0% from 45 to 64, and 7.8% who were 65 years of age or older. The median age was 33 years. For every 100 females, there were 95.1 males. For every 100 females age 18 and over, there were 90.8 males.

The median income for a household in the community was $54,250, and the median income for a family was $60,392. Males had a median income of $33,872 versus $34,531 for females. The per capita income for the community was $19,709. About 5.2% of families and 6.6% of the population were below the poverty line, including 8.5% of those under age 18 and 5.6% of those age 65 or over.

In 2000, 6.1% of Woodlawn residents identified as being of Nigerian heritage. This was the highest percentage of Nigerian Americans of any place in the country.

== Education ==
It is within the Prince George's County School District.

Zoned schools include:

- Elementary (all in the CDP): Beacon Heights, Glenridge, and Woodridge
- Charles Carroll Middle School in New Carrollton
- Parkdale High School in Riverdale Park
