= Parkdale High School =

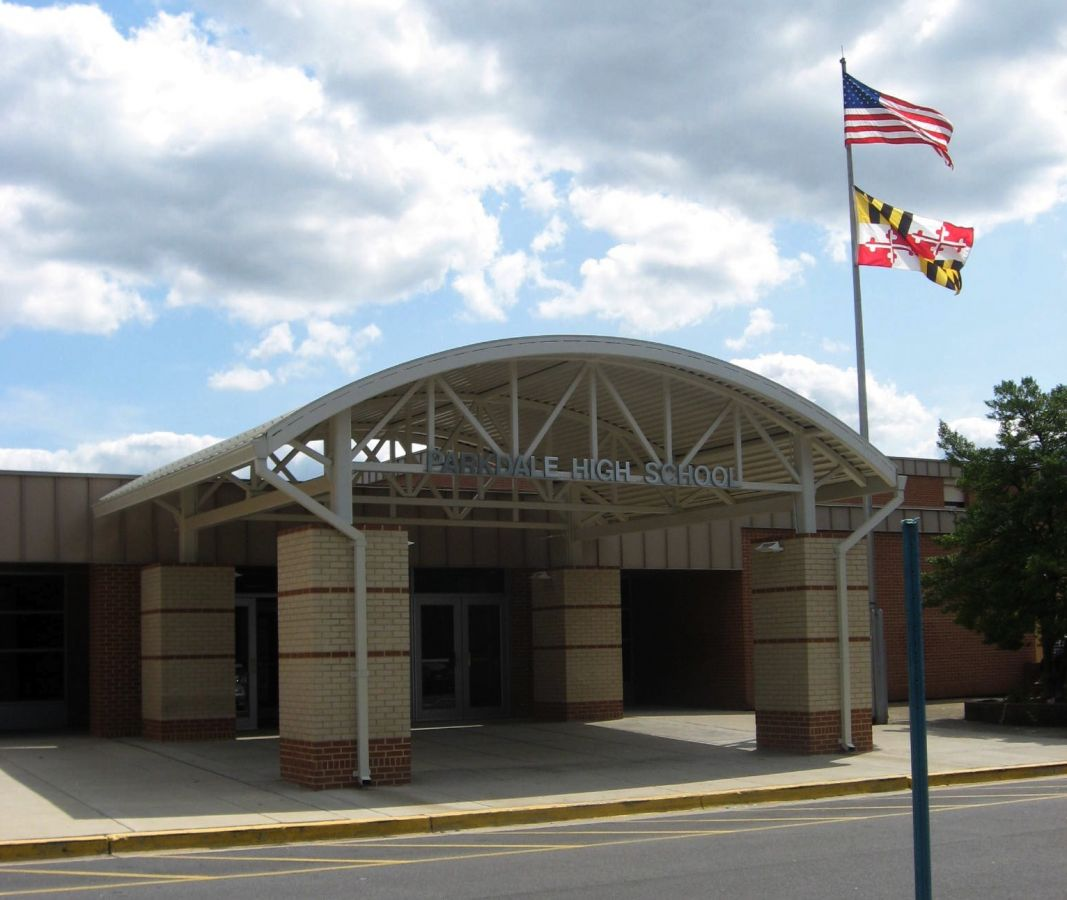

Location
- 6001 Good Luck Road; Riverdale Park, Maryland 20737; United States; 38.97024°N 76.90461°W

Information
- School type: Public, Magnet High School
- Motto: "Building a Brighter Future — One child at a Time!"
- Founded: February 1, 1968
- School district: Prince George's County Public Schools
- Superintendent: Monica Goldson
- Principal: Tasha Graves-Henderson (2016– )
- Grades: 9–12
- Enrollment: 2,800 (2024)
- Language: English
- Campus: Suburban
- Colors: Forest Green & Gold
- Mascot: Panther
- Rival: Bladensburg High School; DuVal High School
- Yearbook: Lair
- Communities served: Riverdale Park, New Carrollton, Woodlawn
- Feeder schools: Charles Carroll Middle School; William Wirt Middle School
- Website: www.pgcps.org/parkdale/

Parkdale High School (PHS) is a public high school located in Riverdale Park, Maryland, United States. It is part of the Prince George's County Public Schools system. Enrollment was 2,800 students in grades nine through twelve as of 2024.

Parkdale High School serves: portions of Riverdale Park and East Riverdale, all of Woodlawn, and the majority of New Carrollton.

It hosts an International Baccalaureate (IB) magnet program.

== History ==
Parkdale High School opened on February 1, 1968.

=== Principals ===
- G Allen Sager (1968–1977)
- Charles C Cockrell (1977–1981)
- James V Foran (1981– )
- Alonzo Grigsby (c 1984– )
- William LeFevre (c 1988–1999)
- Donald Horrigan (2000–2006)
- David P Burton (2006–2010)
- Cheryl Logan (2010–2013)
- Tanya Washington (2013–2016)
- Tasha Graves-Henderson (2016– )

== Notable alumni ==
- Leon Brown - professional football player
- Sugar Ray Leonard
- Moses Nyeman — professional soccer player for D.C. United (entered with class of 2017; did not graduate)

== Sports ==
- Baseball
- Basketball (boys and girls)
- Bocce
- Cross country
- Cheerleading
- Football
- Golf
- Lacrosse (boys and girls)
- Soccer (boys and girls)
- Softball
- Swimming (boys and girls)
- Tennis (boys and girls)
- Track and field (boys and girls)
- Volleyball
- Wrestling

== Demographics ==
Population of Parkdale High School (as of June 2020).

Year	White	African American	Asian	Hispanic	Other	Total
2009	86	1173	74	743	n/a	2082
2010	85	1143	79	852	n/a	2166
2011	84	1107	91	906	9	2205
2012	87	1047	97	910	24	2172
2013	82	943	103	919	27	2083
2014	78	908	88	921	42	2046
2015	75	865	85	1071	46	2148
2016	79	875	75	1114	47	2197
2017	97	866	72	1197	42	2285
2018	91	850	79	1336	35	2402
2019	79	792	86	1373	29	2367
2020	73	718	61	1473	24	2354

== See also ==
- Parkdale High School Official Website
- Parkdale High School Facts & Figures
