= Highland Records =

American record label

- Founder: Sid Talmadge
- Country of origin: United States
- Location: California

Highland Records is a defunct record label that was based in California in the 1960s and 1970s owned by Sid Talmadge. They often served as a starting point for young musicians who quickly moved on to other better-known labels such as Motown or Brunswick.

== Client list ==
- Joe & the Fantastics
- The Kendalls
- Dick Michaels and the Hartford Group
- Frank Lucas
- Rosie and the Originals
- The Dee Jayes
- The Rumblers
- The War-Babies
- Frank Wilson
- Thee Counts
- Jim Gamble
- Bobby Montgomery
- Mike & the Censations
- N'Betweens (Slade) (From Wolverhampton, England/UK) - A Side 'Security'/B Side 'Evil Witchman' Highland 1173 released October 1966 and produced by Kim Fowley
- The Explosions a.k.a. The Xplosions! (From Compton/Los Angeles, CA) songs written by Lionel J. Bihm Jr., Song - "Animated Heart" (As seen on YouTube)
- Bobby Charles Highland #711 Come On.

== See also ==
- List of record labels
