= Rosie and the Originals =

American pop band

Rosie & the Originals
- Rosie and the Originals c. 1961

Background information
- Origin: San Diego, California, U.S.
- Genres: Rock and roll; R&B; pop; easy listening; doo-wop
- Years active: 1960–1963, 1969–1973
- Labels: Highland; Brunswick
- Past members: Rosie Hamlin; Noah Tafolla; David Ponci; Tony Gomez; Carl Von Goodat; Alfred Barrett; James Bentley; Gene Romero; Joe Yancho

Rosie and the Originals were an American 1960s musical group best known for their single "Angel Baby". Fronted by lead singer Rosie Hamlin, the group produced two singles (including "Angel Baby") for Highland Records and, like many other musicians of the era, ended up in protracted legal battles with their record label over royalties and credits.

== Career ==
=== Establishment ===
Rosalie "Rosie" Méndez Hamlin was raised in Anchorage, Alaska, before moving to California; she was of Mexican and English descent. She was trained on piano in her youth and started singing with a band at 13. She wrote the lyrics for "Angel Baby" as a poem for "[her] very first boyfriend" when she was 14 years old, attending Mission Bay High School in San Diego, California. When she was 15, she and some friends rented the only recording studio they could find within 100 miles of San Diego located in San Marcos, California, to record the song. The studio was owned by an airplane mechanic who had taken part of his hangar to make it. After taking the master to a department store, they convinced a manager to play it in the listening booth of the store's music department. The song received positive reactions from teenage listeners, and a scout from Highland Records offered the group a recording contract, under the condition that the company take possession of the master recording, and that David Ponci be named as the author of the song, as he was the eldest member of the group.

"Angel Baby" made its radio debut in November 1960, before the group had even received their contract. When the contract finally came, Hamlin found that she was ineligible to collect record royalties from the song because she was not listed as the songwriter. This led to the group's break-up, and although Hamlin secured the copyright to her music in 1961, decades of battles over royalties followed.

In 1961, "Angel Baby" was also released in Canada (#6) on the Zirkon label and in Australia and England on London Records. The British release slightly edited the intro.

=== Departure from Highland Records ===
After leaving Highland Records, Hamlin recorded a full-length album with guitarist Noah Tafolla for Brunswick Records and toured with the label's other artists under her solo name. Hamlin and Tafolla married and had two children together. Their son Joey Tafolla is a guitarist best known for his solo career in the 1980s, and for being a member of the band Jag Panzer. In 1963, Hamlin retired from singing to spend time with her family. She returned to record singles in 1969 and again in 1973, performing occasionally throughout the 1970s and 1980s and more regularly throughout the 1990s and 2000s, which included performances at Madison Square Garden in 2002.

=== Later years ===
In 1995, Rosie & the Originals were portrayed in the film My Family, performing "Angel Baby." Hamlin's part was played by Jeanette Jurado of the group Expose. In 1996, Linda Ronstadt recorded a version of "Angel Baby" for her album Dedicated to the One I Love.

In 1999, Ace Records released The Best of Rosie & the Originals, including all the Highland tracks as well as Brunswick recordings and unreleased tracks. The following year, the label released the album Angel Baby Revisited, with previously unreleased material. In 2002, Hamlin performed "Angel Baby" on a PBS-TV program, Red White & Rock. Hamlin died in Belen, New Mexico on March 30, 2017, aged 71. Two years later, Noah Tafolla died in Napa, California on September 9, 2019, aged 76.

In November 2025, cleaned up stereo mixes of "Angel Baby" and "Lonely Blue Nights" were released presenting both in stereo for the first time.Both were released as part of a new 2025 compilation album titled Rosie Forever!. In June 2026, weeks prior to what would have been Hamlin's eighty-first birthday, Hamlin's estate released a brand new stereo version of "Angel Baby" along with a brand new first time stereo mix release of "My Darling Forever".

== Legacy ==
In a 1969 interview with Life magazine, John Lennon named Hamlin as one of his favorite singers. As can be heard on circulating recordings, the Beatles mention the song "Give Me Love" during sessions on 01/24/69. Lennon and friends can be heard in a quickly busked version of "Angel Baby," taped at his birthday in 1971. Lennon recorded a studio version of "Angel Baby" for his 1975 Rock 'n' Roll album, but the track was not issued until 1986's Menlove Avenue. Rosie and the Originals are referenced by Led Zeppelin in the liner notes from their 1973 album Houses of the Holy, following the printed lyrics of the song "D'yer Mak'er." The quote is "Whatever happened to Rosie and the Originals?" "Rosie" also shows up in the Led Zeppelin song "How Many More Times".

== Discography ==
=== Singles ===
Year	Title	Peak chart positions			Record Label	B-side
Year	Title	US Pop	US R&B	CAN	Record Label	B-side
1960	"Angel Baby"	5	5	3	Highland	"Give Me Love"
1962	"Lonely Blue Nights"	66	—	—	Highland	"We'll Have a Chance"
1962	"Why Did You Leave Me"	—	—	—	Highland	"Angel From Above"
1973	"You're No Good"	—	—	—	Wax World	"I Don't Understand"

=== Albums ===
- Lonely Blue Nights (Brunswick, 1962)
- The Best of Rosie & the Originals (Ace, 1999)
- Angel Baby Revisited (Ace, 2000)
- Rosie Forever! (HMG/Rosie Hamlin, 2025)

== Sample ==
- Angel Baby sample
