= East Riverdale, Maryland =

- Census-designated place
- Coordinates: 38°57′23″N 76°54′49″W
- Country: United States
- State: Maryland
- County: Prince George's

Area
  - Total: 1.61 sq mi (4.18 km^{2})
  - Land: 1.61 sq mi (4.18 km^{2})
  - Water: 0 sq mi (0.00 km^{2})
- Elevation: 36 ft (11 m)

Population (2020)
  - Total: 18,459
  - Density: 11,427.6/sq mi (4,412.22/km^{2})
- Time zone: UTC−5 (Eastern (EST))
  - Summer (DST): UTC−4 (EDT)
- FIPS code: 24-24650
- GNIS feature ID: 1714365

East Riverdale is an unincorporated area and census-designated place (CDP) in Prince George's County, Maryland, United States. The population was 18,459 at the 2020 census.

== Geography ==
East Riverdale is located at 38°57′23″N 76°54′49″W (38.956315, −76.913615).

According to the United States Census Bureau, the CDP has a total area of 1.6 square miles (4.1 km^{2}), all land.

== Demographics ==
Historical population
Census	Pop.	Note	%±
1970	8,941		—
1980	14,117		57.9%
1990	14,187		0.5%
2000	14,961		5.5%
2010	15,509		3.7%
2020	18,459		19.0%
U.S. Decennial Census; 2010 2020; Census area returned as Riverdale Heights-East Pines in 1970.

=== Racial and ethnic composition ===
East Riverdale CDP, Maryland – Racial and ethnic composition Note: the US Census treats Hispanic/Latino as an ethnic category. This table excludes Latinos from the racial categories and assigns them to a separate category. Hispanics/Latinos may be of any race.
Race / Ethnicity (NH = Non-Hispanic)	Pop 2000	Pop 2010	Pop 2020	% 2000	% 2010	% 2020
White alone (NH)	2,709	1,323	937	18.11%	8.53%	5.08%
Black or African American alone (NH)	7,333	5,198	4,229	49.01%	33.52%	22.91%
Native American or Alaska Native alone (NH)	42	26	17	0.28%	0.17%	0.09%
Asian alone (NH)	537	403	1,039	3.59%	2.60%	5.63%
Native Hawaiian or Pacific Islander alone (NH)	7	5	1	0.05%	0.03%	0.01%
Other race alone (NH)	38	34	101	0.25%	0.22%	0.55%
Mixed race or Multiracial (NH)	335	247	456	2.24%	1.59%	2.47%
Hispanic or Latino (any race)	3,960	8,273	11,679	26.47%	53.34%	63.27%
Total	14,961	15,509	18,459	100.00%	100.00%	100.00%

=== 2020 census ===
As of the 2020 census, East Riverdale had a population of 18,459. The median age was 30.4 years. 30.4% of residents were under the age of 18 and 7.0% of residents were 65 years of age or older. For every 100 females there were 104.3 males, and for every 100 females age 18 and over there were 104.8 males age 18 and over.

100.0% of residents lived in urban areas, while 0.0% lived in rural areas.

There were 4,652 households in East Riverdale, of which 53.4% had children under the age of 18 living in them. Of all households, 46.0% were married-couple households, 19.5% were households with a male householder and no spouse or partner present, and 25.0% were households with a female householder and no spouse or partner present. About 14.0% of all households were made up of individuals and 5.1% had someone living alone who was 65 years of age or older.

There were 4,847 housing units, of which 4.0% were vacant. The homeowner vacancy rate was 1.5% and the rental vacancy rate was 3.6%.

Racial composition as of the 2020 census
Race	Number	Percent
White	1,734	9.4%
Black or African American	4,310	23.3%
American Indian and Alaska Native	593	3.2%
Asian	1,062	5.8%
Native Hawaiian and Other Pacific Islander	13	0.1%
Some other race	8,652	46.9%
Two or more races	2,095	11.3%

=== 2000 census ===
As of the census of 2000, there were 14,961 people, 4,538 households, and 3,353 families residing in the CDP. The population density was 9,103.9 inhabitants per square mile (3,515.0/km^{2}). There were 4,778 housing units at an average density of 2,907.5 per square mile (1,122.6/km^{2}). The racial makeup of the CDP was 28.71% White, 49.98% African American, 0.59% Native American, 3.71% Asian, 0.14% Pacific Islander, 13.18% from other races, and 3.68% from two or more races. Hispanic or Latino of any race were 26.47% of the population.

There were 4,538 households, out of which 42.4% had children under the age of 18 living with them, 43.9% were married couples living together, 21.4% had a female householder with no husband present, and 26.1% were non-families. 19.9% of all households were made up of individuals, and 4.5% had someone living alone who was 65 years of age or older. The average household size was 3.29 and the average family size was 3.74.

In the CDP, the population was spread out, with 31.1% under the age of 18, 12.0% from 18 to 24, 33.5% from 25 to 44, 17.8% from 45 to 64, and 5.7% who were 65 years of age or older. The median age was 29 years. For every 100 females, there were 102.9 males. For every 100 females age 18 and over, there were 101.6 males.

The median income for a household in the CDP was $45,547, and the median income for a family was $48,918. Males had a median income of $31,807 versus $30,520 for females. The per capita income for the CDP was $15,758. About 11.1% of families and 13.7% of the population were below the poverty line, including 16.0% of those under age 18 and 8.9% of those age 65 or over.

== Education ==
East Riverdale is within the Prince George's County Public Schools system. Schools serving the CDP include:

Elementary schools:

- Berwyn Heights Elementary School
- Bladensburg Elementary School
- Port Towns Elementary School
- Riverdale Elementary School
- Templeton Elementary School

Middle schools:

- William Wirt Middle School
- Charles Carroll Middle School

High schools:

- Bladensburg High School
- Parkdale High School
