= John Lennon discography =

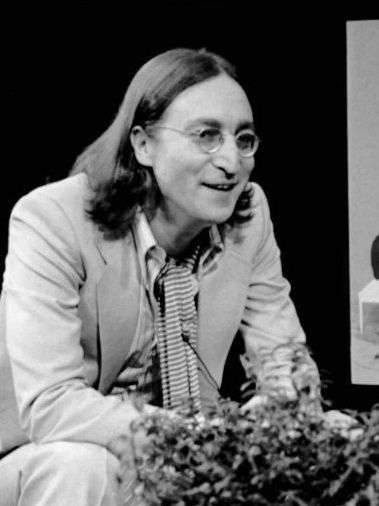
- Lennon being interviewed by Tom Snyder in 1975
- Studio albums: 11
- Live albums: 3
- Compilation albums: 15
- Singles: 23
- Video albums: 15
- Music videos: 64
- Box sets: 5

John Lennon was an English musician, best known as the co-founder, co-lead vocalist and rhythm guitarist of the Beatles. After three experimental albums with Yoko Ono, using tape loops, interviews, musique concrète, and other avant-garde performance techniques, Lennon's solo career properly began with the 1969 single "Give Peace a Chance". Lennon then released two more singles, "Cold Turkey" (1969) and "Instant Karma!" (1970), and a live album, Live Peace in Toronto (1969), before the official break-up of the Beatles.

Lennon's first solo album after the Beatles' break-up was John Lennon/Plastic Ono Band, released simultaneously with Ono's album of the same name. He released the album Imagine the following year, which became his most critical and commercial success. His 1972 political themed album Some Time in New York City received scathing reviews and performed poorly commercially. Lennon's next two albums, Mind Games (1973) and Walls and Bridges (1974) were better received and had more commercial success. In 1975, Lennon released his covers album Rock 'n' Roll before retiring from music to focus on raising his newborn son Sean. He returned to the music industry in 1980 with the album Double Fantasy, but was murdered three weeks after its release. Following his death, the 1984 album Milk and Honey was posthumously released.

In 2020, to celebrate what would have been Lennon's 80th birthday, Ono and her son Sean released the box set Gimme Some Truth. The Ultimate Mixes, which contained newly remixed versions of 36 of Lennon's songs. In 2018, 2021 and 2024, super deluxe box-sets of Imagine, John Lennon/Plastic Ono Band and Mind Games were released. In 2025, a modified version of "Some Time in New York City" super deluxe box set called "Power to the People" was released.

Lennon had 25 number-one singles on the US Billboard Hot 100 chart as a writer, co-writer or performer.

== Albums ==
=== Studio albums ===
Year	Title	Peak chart positions										Certifications
Year	Title	UK	AUS	CAN	FRA	GER	ITA	JPN	NLD	NOR	US	Certifications
1968	Unfinished Music No. 1: Two Virgins (with Yoko Ono): Label: Apple; Released: 29 November 1968	—	—	—	—	—	—	—	—	—	124	
1969	Unfinished Music No. 2: Life with the Lions (with Yoko Ono): Label: Zapple; Released: 9 May 1969	—	—	—	—	—	—	—	—	—	174	
1969	Wedding Album (with Yoko Ono): Label: Apple; Released: 7 November 1969	—	—	—	—	—	—	—	—	—	178	
1970	John Lennon/Plastic Ono Band: Label: Apple; Released: 11 December 1970	8	3	2	—	7	8	5	1	4	6	RIAA: Gold; BPI: Silver (2021 edition)
1971	Imagine: Label: Apple; Released: 9 September 1971 (US) 8 October 1971 (UK)	1	1	2	5	10	1	1	1	1	1	RIAA: 2× Platinum; BPI: Gold
1972	Some Time in New York City (with Yoko Ono): Label: Apple; Released: 12 June 1972 (US) 15 September 1972 (UK)	11	10	77	—	—	6	15	—	2	48	
1973	Mind Games: Label: Apple; Released: 29 October 1973 (US) 16 November 1973 (UK)	13	8	28	—	6	14	6	7	1	9	RIAA: Gold; BPI: Gold
1974	Walls and Bridges: Label: Apple; Released: 29 September 1974 (US) 4 October 1974 (UK)	6	4	1	—	41	11	14	16	3	1	RIAA: Gold; BPI: Silver
1975	Rock 'n' Roll: Label: Apple; Released: 17 February 1975(US) 21 February 1975 (UK)	6	5	5	3	37	12	15	—	9	6	RIAA: Gold; BPI: Gold
1980	Double Fantasy (with Yoko Ono): Label: Geffen; Released: 17 November 1980	1	1	1	2	2	6	2	4	1	1	ARIA: Platinum; RIAA: 3× Platinum; BPI: Platinum; SNEP: Platinum; BVMI: Gold
1984	Milk and Honey (posthumous; with Yoko Ono): Label: Polydor; Released: 27 January 1984	3	4	15	10	20	16	3	4	7	11	RIAA: Gold; BPI: Gold; MC: Gold

=== Live albums ===
Year	Title	Peak chart positions								Certifications
Year	Title	UK	AUS	CAN	FRA	JPN	NOR	SWE	US	Certifications
1969	Live Peace in Toronto 1969 (with The Plastic Ono Band): Label: Apple; Released: 12 December 1969	—	7	—	—	29	19	—	10	RIAA: Gold
1986	Live in New York City: Label: Parlophone, Capitol; Released: 10 February 1986	55	66	33	33	13	—	12	41	RIAA: Gold
"—" denotes releases that did not chart.

=== Compilation albums ===
Year	Album	Peak chart positions										Certification
Year	Album	UK	AUS	AUT	CAN	GER	JPN	NLD	NOR	SWE	US	Certification
1975	Shaved Fish: Label: Apple; Released: 24 October 1975	8	8	5	70	37	22	5	9	28	12	RIAA: Platinum; BPI: Gold
1982	The John Lennon Collection: Label: Parlophone, Geffen Records (US); Released: 8 November 1982 (UK), 10 November 1982 (US)	1	1	—	29	62	8	32	1	4	33	RIAA: 3× Platinum; ARIA: 4× Platinum; BPI: 3× Platinum; IFPI AUT: Gold; MC: Platinum; SNEP: Platinum; IFPI NOR: Gold
1986	Menlove Ave.: Label: Parlophone; Released: 3 November 1986	—	—	—	92	—	32	—	—	—	127	
1988	Imagine: John Lennon: Label: Parlophone; Released: 10 October 1988	64	14	—	—	—	14	—	—	—	31	RIAA: Gold; BPI: Gold; MC: Platinum; IFPI SWI: Gold
1997	Lennon Legend: The Very Best of John Lennon: Label: Parlophone; Released: 27 October 1997 (UK), 13 January 1998 (US)	4	37	5	86	11	46	85	39	28	65	RIAA: Platinum; BPI: 3× Platinum; ARIA: 4× Platinum; IFPI AUT: Gold; MC: Platinum; BVMI: Gold; RIAJ: Gold; IFPI SWI: Gold
1998	Wonsaponatime: Label: Capitol/EMI; Released: 2 November 1998	76	83	—	—	—	57	—	—	—	—	
2001	Instant Karma: All-Time Greatest Hits: Label: Timeless/Traditions Alive Music; Released: 1 February 2002	—	—	—	—	—	—	—	—	—	—	
2004	Acoustic: Label: Capitol/EMI; Released: 1 November 2004	133	—	—	—	—	23	—	—	—	31	
2005	Peace, Love & Truth: Label: EMI; Released: 4 August 2005	—	—	—	—	—	—	—	—	—	—	
2005	Working Class Hero: The Definitive Lennon: Label: Parlophone/Capitol/EMI; Released: 3 October 2005	11	53	22	—	44	39	52	13	17	135	BPI: Gold; MC: Gold
2006	The U.S. vs. John Lennon: Label: Parlophone/EMI/Capitol; Released: 25 September 2006	—	—	—	—	—	—	—	—	—	—	
2006	Remember (Starbucks-released compilation): Label: EMI/Starbucks; Released: 2006	—	—	—	—	—	—	—	—	—	44	
2010	Power to the People: The Hits: Label: EMI/Capitol; Released: 5 October 2010	15	10	16	7	33	25	64	—	33	24	BPI: Silver; FIMI: Gold
2014	Icon: Label: EMI/Capitol; Released: 9 September 2014	—	—	—	—	—	—	—	—	—	—	MC: Gold
2020	Gimme Some Truth. The Ultimate Mixes: Label: Capitol; Released: 9 October 2020	3	61	4	50	6	—	22	—	—	40	BPI: Gold
"—" denotes releases that did not chart.

== Box sets ==
Year	Album	Peak chart positions										Certification
Year	Album	UK	AUS	CAN	GER	ITA	JPN	NLD	NOR	SWE	US	Certification
1990	Lennon: Label: Parlophone; Released: 30 October 1990	—	39	—	—	—	53	—	—	—	—	RIAJ: Platinum
1998	John Lennon Anthology: Label: Capitol/EMI; Released: 2 November 1998	62	—	86	—	42	30	—	—	—	99	RIAA: Gold
2010	Gimme Some Truth: Label: EMI/Capitol; Released: 5 October 2010	—	—	65	—	—	71	—	—	—	—	
2010	John Lennon Signature Box: Label: EMI/Capitol; Released: 5 October 2010	—	—	—	19	—	21	16	23	40	148	
2025	Power to the People (John & Yoko / Plastic Ono Band with Elephant's Memory and Special Guests): Label: UMC; Released: 10 October 2025	72	—	—	—	—	—	—	—	—	196	
"—" denotes releases that did not chart.

== Singles ==
Year	Title	Peak chart positions										Certifications	Album
Year	Title	UK	AUS	AUT	CAN	GER	JPN	NLD	NOR	SWI	US	Certifications	Album
1969	"Give Peace a Chance" b/w "Remember Love" (Plastic Ono Band)	2	6	2	8	4	81	1	11	4	14		non-album singles
1969	"Cold Turkey" b/w "Don't Worry Kyoko (Mummy's Only Looking for Her Hand in the Snow)" (Plastic Ono Band)	14	25	—	30	—	91	39	9	—	30		non-album singles
1970	"Instant Karma!" "Who Has Seen the Wind?" (Lennon/Ono with the Plastic Ono Band)	5	6	4	2	7	58	7	6	31	3	RIAA: Gold	non-album singles
1970	"Mother" (Note: Not released in the UK.) b/w "Why" (Yoko Ono)	—	57	9	12	26	30	10	—	3	43		John Lennon/Plastic Ono Band
1971	"Power to the People" b/w "Open Your Box" (UK) (Yoko Ono) "Touch Me" (US) (Yoko Ono) (John Lennon / Plastic Ono Band)	7	21	11	4	7	66	4	3	5	11		non-album single
1971	"Imagine" "It's So Hard" (US) "Working Class Hero" (UK)	1 (Note: "Imagine" was not released as a single in the UK until 1975, where it peaked at number 6. The song was re-released as a single in 1980, peaking at number 1. The song re-entered the chart in 1988, 1999, 2007 and 2012, peaking at number 45, number 3, number 75 and number 18 respectively.)	1	4	1	7	14	5	3	6	3	BPI: Platinum1975 release; BPI: 2× Platinum2007 release; RIAA: 3× Platinum; FIMI: Platinum; Pro-Música Brasil: Platinum	Imagine
1971	"Happy Xmas (War Is Over)" (John & Yoko/Plastic Ono Band with the Harlem Community Choir) b/w "Listen, the Snow Is Falling" (Yoko/Plastic Ono Band)	2	6	6	24	6	30	2	2	10	38 (Note: "Happy Xmas (War Is Over)" did not chart until December 2018.)	BPI: 3× Platinum; ARIA: 2× Platinum; RIAJ: Gold; FIMI: 2× Platinum	non-album single
1972	"Woman Is the Nigger of the World" (John Lennon / Plastic Ono Band with Elephant's Memory and Invisible Strings) b/w "Sisters, O Sisters" (Yoko Ono)	—	—	—	73	—	38	21	—	—	57		Some Time in New York City
1973	"Mind Games" b/w "Meat City"	26	16	—	11	37	46	16	2	—	18		Mind Games
1974	"Whatever Gets You thru the Night" (John Lennon with the Plastic Ono Nuclear Band & Elton John) b/w "Beef Jerky"	36	34	—	2	42	72	21	—	—	1		Walls and Bridges
1974	"#9 Dream" b/w "What You Got"	23	—	—	35	—	97	33	—	—	9		Walls and Bridges
1975	"Stand by Me" b/w "Move Over Ms. L"	30	61	19	13	22	74	—	—	—	20		Rock 'n' Roll
1975	"Ya Ya" b/w "Be-Bop-A-Lula"	—	—	—	—	47	—	—	—	—	—		Rock 'n' Roll
1980	"(Just Like) Starting Over" b/w "Kiss Kiss Kiss" (Yoko Ono)	1	1	1	1	4	37	14	2	1	1	BPI: Gold; RIAA: Gold; RIAJ: Gold	Double Fantasy
1981	"Woman" b/w "Beautiful Boys" (Yoko Ono)	1	4	3	1	4	—	11	5	2	2	BPI: Silver; RIAA: Gold	Double Fantasy
1981	"Watching the Wheels" b/w "Beautiful Boy (Darling Boy)" (US Reissue) "Yes, I'm Your Angel" (Yoko Ono) (UK/US)	30	45	12	3	46	—	—	—	6	10		Double Fantasy
1981	"I Saw Her Standing There" b/w "Whatever Gets You Thru the Night" (live) "Lucy in the Sky with Diamonds" (live) (Elton John with John Lennon and the Muscle Shoals Horns)	40	81	—	—	—	—	—	8	—	—		28 November 1974
1982	"Love" b/w "Gimme Some Truth"	41	94	—	—	—	58	—	—	—	—	RIAJ: Gold	The John Lennon Collection
1984	"Nobody Told Me" b/w "O' Sanity" (Yoko Ono) "I'm Stepping Out" (1990)	6	6	—	4	55	—	13	7	—	5		Milk and Honey
1984	"Borrowed Time" b/w "Your Hands" (Yoko Ono)	32	—	—	—	—	—	—	—	—	108		Milk and Honey
1984	"I'm Stepping Out" b/w "Sleepless Night" (Yoko Ono)	88	—	—	—	—	—	—	—	—	55		Milk and Honey
1984	"Every Man Has a Woman Who Loves Him" b/w "It's Alright" (Sean Lennon)	—	—	—	—	—	—	—	—	—	—		Every Man Has a Woman
1985	"Jealous Guy" b/w "Going Down on Love" (UK) "Give Peace a Chance" (US)	65	—	—	—	—	—	—	—	—	80	BPI: Silver (2011 release)	Imagine
"—" denotes releases that did not chart or were not released in that territory.

== Videography ==
=== Home videos ===
Year	Title	Notes
1971	Sweet Toronto: Released: 22 December 1971 (Theatrical); 1988 (Europe Laserdisc/VHS); 1989 (US Laserdisc); 1990 (Europe VHS); 20 May 1998 (US DVD); 2001, 2002, 2003, 2007 (DVD); 23 June 2009 (US DVD)	Concert film of the Toronto Rock'N'Roll Revival Festival 1969.
1972	John Lennon and Yoko Ono Present the One-to-One Concert (TV special title, 40 minutes): Released: 15 December 1972 (Broadcast); Live in New York City (video title, 55 minutes): 1985 (US Laserdisc/VHS); 24 February 1986 (UK VHS); 21 December 1989 (US VHS); 1989 (Europe Laserdisc/VHS); 1992 (Europe Laserdisc); Power To the People (film title, 81 minutes): 29 April 2026 (Theatrical)	Television special benefit concert for the Willowbrook Institution for Retarded Children in New York. Filmed 30 August 1972 at Madison Square Garden by Jake Films.
1972	Imagine: The Film: Released: 23 December 1972 (TV); 1985 (UK Laserdisc/VHS); 1986 (US Laserdisc/VHS); 21 December 1989 (US VHS); 5 October 2018 (US DVD/Blu-ray)	Music film television special.
1988	Imagine: John Lennon: Released: 7 October 1988 (Theatrical); 1988 (UK VHS); 1989 (US Laserdisc/VHS); 1 July 1991 (US VHS); 31 March 1995 (US VHS); 30 June 2000 (US DVD); 6 December 2005 (Deluxe Edition DVD)	"The Definitive Film Portrait" documentary.
1992	The John Lennon Video Collection: Released: 1992 (UK VHS); 1992 (US Laserdisc/VCD); 6 April 1993 (US VHS); 1996 (US Laserdisc/VCD); 10 November 1998 (Europe VHS)	Collection of the original versions of the music videos.
2000	Gimme Some Truth: The Making of John Lennon's Imagine Album: Released: 11 April 2000 (US VHS/DVD); 27 April 2000 (Europe DVD); 5 October 2018 (US DVD/Blu-ray)	Documentary video with bonus footage.
2000	John & Yoko's Year of Peace: Released: 2000 (TV); 17 September 2002 (US VHS/DVD); 29 September 2009 (Europe DVD)	Documentary on the "Bed-In" for peace.
2003	Lennon Legend: The Very Best of John Lennon: Released: 3 November 2003 (Europe DVD); 18 November 2003 (US DVD)	Remastered music video collection.
2005	The Dick Cavett Show – John & Yoko Collection: Released: 1 November 2005 (US DVD)	Three episodes (9/11/71, 9/24/71, 5/12/72) of their appearances on the show with special features.
2006	The U.S. vs. John Lennon: Released: 15 September 2006 (Theatrical); 13 February 2007 (US DVD)	Documentary on the U.S. government's attempt to deport Lennon.
2006	John & Yoko: Give Peace a Song: Released: 3 October 2006 (US DVD)	Documentary on the "Bed-In" for peace.
2008	Classic Albums: John Lennon/Plastic Ono Band: Released: 29 April 2008 (US DVD); 30 December 2008 (Europe DVD); 9 June 2010 (Europe DVD)	The making of the classic album.
2010	LennoNYC: Released: 25 September 2010 (Theatrical); 7 December 2010 (US DVD); 11 January 2011 (US Blu-ray); 20 August 2013 (Europe DVD)	Documentary on Lennon's life in New York City.
2018	John & Yoko: Above Us Only Sky: Released: 24 November 2018 (UK Theatrical); 10 March 2019 (US Broadcast); 13 September 2019 (US/Europe DVD/Blu-ray)	Documentary on their relationship during the making of the Imagine album.
2024	One to One: John & Yoko: Released: 30 August 2024 (Venice); 11 April 2025 (US Theatrical); 2025 (Blu-ray/DVD/streaming)	Documentary on the context around the Live in New York City remastered footage of the One-to-One benefit concert.

=== Music videos ===
Year	Title	Director	Notes
1969	"Give Peace a Chance"	John Lennon & Yoko Ono	Version 1 has been presented in color, black & white and an extended cut in color
1969	"Cold Turkey"	John Lennon & Yoko Ono	Version 1
1969	"Cold Turkey" (Live)	D. A. Pennebaker	Live version from 1971 film Sweet Toronto
1970	"Instant Karma!" (Live)	Brian Whitehouse	Filmed for Top of the Pops on 11 February, 2 versions aired: "Cue Cards" & "Knitting"
1971	"Imagine" (Version 1)	John Lennon & Yoko Ono	Filmed for the 1972 musical TV film Imagine
1971	"Crippled Inside" (Version 1 & 2)	John Lennon & Yoko Ono	Filmed for the 1972 musical TV film Imagine
1971	"Jealous Guy" (Version 1)	John Lennon & Yoko Ono	Filmed for the 1972 musical TV film Imagine
1971	"It's So Hard"	John Lennon & Yoko Ono	Filmed for the 1972 musical TV film Imagine
1971	"I Don't Wanna Be a Soldier Mama"	John Lennon & Yoko Ono	Filmed for the 1972 musical TV film Imagine
1971	"Power to the People" (Version 1)	John Lennon & Yoko Ono	Filmed for the 1972 musical TV film Imagine
1971	"Gimme Some Truth"	John Lennon & Yoko Ono	Filmed for the 1972 musical TV film Imagine
1971	"Oh My Love"	John Lennon & Yoko Ono	Filmed for the 1972 musical TV film Imagine
1971	"How Do You Sleep?"	John Lennon & Yoko Ono	Filmed for the 1972 musical TV film Imagine
1971	"How?"	John Lennon & Yoko Ono	Filmed for the 1972 musical TV film Imagine
1971	"Oh Yoko!"	John Lennon & Yoko Ono	Filmed for the 1972 musical TV film Imagine
1971	Yoko Ono: "Don't Count the Waves"	John Lennon & Yoko Ono	Lennon co-produced the music and appears in the videos with Ono
1971	Yoko Ono: "Mrs. Lennon"	John Lennon & Yoko Ono	Lennon co-produced the music and appears in the videos with Ono
1973	"Mind Games"	John Lennon	Version 1, John dancing with a man impersonating Her Majesty the Queen
1974	"Whatever Gets You thru the Night"	John Lennon	Version 1, with Elton John (voice only), original live action with Lennon in Manhattan
1975	"Stand by Me" (Live, Version 1)	Tom Corcoran	Filmed at The Hit Factory in New York on 18 March 1975
1975	"Slippin' and Slidin'" (Live)	Tom Corcoran	Filmed at The Hit Factory in New York on 18 March 1975
1975	"Imagine" (Live)	Dave Wilson	Filmed at the "Salute to Lew Grade" concert on 18 April 1975
1980	"(Just Like) Starting Over"	John Lennon & Yoko Ono	Version 1, first released in 1992 with The John Lennon Video Collection
1981	"Woman"	John Lennon & Yoko Ono	Restored in 2003 for Lennon Legend: The Very Best of John Lennon video
1984	"Nobody Told Me" (Version 1)	John Lennon & Yoko Ono	Archive footage
1984	"Borrowed Time" (Version 1)	John Lennon & Yoko Ono	Archive footage
1984	"I'm Stepping Out"	John Lennon & Yoko Ono	Archive footage
1984	"Grow Old with Me"	John Lennon & Yoko Ono	Archive footage
1984	"Every Man Has a Woman Who Loves Him"	Roger H. Lyons	Original video made for MTV about two people meeting on a boardwalk
1985	"Jealous Guy"	Yoko Ono	Version 2 created for the single release
1986	"Come Together" (Live)	Carol Dysinger & Steve Gebhardt	Used to promote the 1972 Madison Square Garden concert video Live in New York City
1987	"Imagine" (Version 2)	Zbigniew Rybczyński	Created for the Imagine: John Lennon documentary
1988	"Jealous Guy" (Version 3)	Steve Purcell & Andrew Solt	Created for the Imagine: John Lennon documentary
1992	"Happy Xmas (War Is Over)" (Version 1)	Yoko Ono & Gerald Meola	Created for The John Lennon Video Collection
1992	"Power to the People" (Version 2)	Yoko Ono & Gerald Meola	Created for The John Lennon Video Collection
1992	"Mind Games" (Version 2)	Yoko Ono & Gerald Meola	Created for The John Lennon Video Collection
1992	"#9 Dream" (Version 1)	Yoko Ono & Gerald Meola	Created for The John Lennon Video Collection
1992	"Whatever Gets You thru the Night" (Version 2)	John Canemaker	with Elton John, animation created for The John Lennon Video Collection, extended version restored in 1994
1997	"Working Class Hero" (Version 1)	Brian Vosko & Bruce Westcott	Created to promote the John Lennon Anthology
1998	"I'm Losing You" (w/ Cheap Trick)	Dean Karr	Created to promote the John Lennon Anthology
2000	"(Just Like) Starting Over"	Joe Pytka	Version 2
2003	"Cold Turkey" (Version 2)	Simon Hilton, Gebhardt, Lennon & Ono	Created for the 2003 Lennon Legend: The Very Best of John Lennon DVD with archival footage
2003	"Power to the People" (Extended Version 2)	Yoko Ono & Simon Hilton	Created for the 2003 Lennon Legend: The Very Best of John Lennon DVD with archival footage
2003	"Love"	Yoko Ono & Simon Hilton	Created for the 2003 Lennon Legend: The Very Best of John Lennon DVD with archival footage
2003	"Mind Games" (Version 3)	John Lennon & Simon Hilton	Created for the 2003 Lennon Legend: The Very Best of John Lennon DVD with archival footage
2003	"Mother"	Simon Hilton	Created for the 2003 Lennon Legend: The Very Best of John Lennon DVD with archival footage
2003	"Working Class Hero" (Version 2)	Simon Hilton	Created for the 2003 Lennon Legend: The Very Best of John Lennon DVD with archival footage
2003	"Happy Xmas (War Is Over)" (Version 2)	Simon Hilton	Created for the 2003 Lennon Legend: The Very Best of John Lennon DVD with archival footage
2003	"Jealous Guy" (Version 4)	Lennon, Ono & Hilton (editor)	Created for the 2003 Lennon Legend: The Very Best of John Lennon DVD with archival footage
2003	"#9 Dream" (Version 2)	Lennon, Ono & Hilton (editor)	Created for the 2003 Lennon Legend: The Very Best of John Lennon DVD with archival footage
2003	"Stand by Me" (Version 2)	Lennon, Ono & Hilton (editor)	Created for the 2003 Lennon Legend: The Very Best of John Lennon DVD with archival footage
2003	"Beautiful Boy (Darling Boy)"	Lennon, Ono & Hilton (editor)	Created for the 2003 Lennon Legend: The Very Best of John Lennon DVD with archival footage
2003	"Watching the Wheels"	Lennon, Ono & Hilton (editor)	Created for the 2003 Lennon Legend: The Very Best of John Lennon DVD with archival footage
2003	"Nobody Told Me" (Version 2)	Lennon, Ono & Hilton (editor)	Created for the 2003 Lennon Legend: The Very Best of John Lennon DVD with archival footage
2003	"Borrowed Time" (Version 2)	Lennon, Ono & Hilton (editor)	Created for the 2003 Lennon Legend: The Very Best of John Lennon DVD with archival footage
2003	"Give Peace a Chance" (Version 2)	Lennon, Ono & Hilton (editor)	Created for the 2003 Lennon Legend: The Very Best of John Lennon DVD with archival footage
2018	"How Do You Sleep? (Takes 5&6, Raw Mix Outtake)"	Lennon, Ono & Hilton (editor)	Created to promote Imagine: The Ultimate Collection Box Set
2018	"Jealous Guy (Raw Outtake)"	Lennon, Ono & Hilton (editor)	Created to promote Imagine: The Ultimate Collection Box Set
2018	"How? (Raw Outtake)"	Lennon, Ono & Hilton (editor)	Created to promote Imagine: The Ultimate Collection Box Set
2018	"Gimme Some Truth (Raw Outtake)"	Lennon, Ono & Hilton (editor)	Created to promote Imagine: The Ultimate Collection Box Set
2018	"Happy Xmas (War Is Over) (New Alt Acoustic Mix)"	Yoko Ono	Created to promote Imagine: The Ultimate Collection Box Set
2019	"Oh My Love (Raw Studio Mix)"	Yoko Ono	Created to promote Imagine: The Ultimate Collection Box Set
2019	"Oh Yoko! (Bahamas 1969)"	Nic Knowland	Filmed at the Sheraton Oceanus Hotel, Freeport, Bahamas, 25 May 1969
2020	"The Luck of the Irish" (Live w/ Yoko Ono)	John Reilly	Filmed at John & Yoko's apartment, 105 Bank Street, New York, 12 November 1971

== Collaborations and other appearances ==
List of non-single songs by John Lennon from non-John Lennon releases, showing year released and album name
Title	Year	Album
"Imagine" (John Lennon & Liverpool Philharmonic Youth Choir)	2012	A Symphony of British Music

== As session musician and producer ==
Year	Album/single	Collaborator	Comment
1962	B-side: "I've Just Fallen for Someone"	Johnny Gentle	uncredited co-writer (middle eight)
1965	"You've Got to Hide Your Love Away"	The Silkie	producer
1967	"We Love You"	The Rolling Stones	backing vocals, tambourine, handclaps
1970	"Down in the Alley"	Ronnie Hawkins	spoken introduction
1970	Yoko Ono/Plastic Ono Band	Yoko Ono	producer, guitar
1971	"God Save Oz" / "Do the Oz"	Bill Elliot and the Elastic Oz Band	writer of both songs, lead vocals on "Do the Oz"
1971	Fly	Yoko Ono	producer, guitar, piano, organ
1972	The Pope Smokes Dope	David Peel and The Lower East Side	producer
1972	Elephant's Memory	Elephant's Memory	producer, guitar, backing vocals
1973	Approximately Infinite Universe	Yoko Ono	producer, guitar, backing vocals
1973	Ringo	Ringo Starr	writer, piano and harmony vocals on "I'm the Greatest"
1973	Feeling the Space	Yoko Ono	producer, guitar on "She Hits Back" and "Woman Power"
1973	"Too Many Cooks (Spoil the Soup)"	Mick Jagger	producer
1974	Pussy Cats	Harry Nilsson	producer, co-writer of "Mucho Mungo/Mt. Elga"
1974	Caribou	Elton John	Tambourine on "The Bitch Is Back"
1974	Goodnight Vienna	Ringo Starr	writer/vocals/piano on title song, guitar on "All by Myself" and "Only You (And You Alone)"
1974	"Lucy in the Sky with Diamonds" / "One Day (At a Time)"	Elton John	guitar, backing vocals
1974	John Dawson Winter III	Johnny Winter	writer of "Rock and Roll People"
1975	Two Sides of the Moon	Keith Moon	writer of "Move Over Ms. L"
1975	Young Americans	David Bowie	vocals, guitar, backing vocals on "Across the Universe" and "Fame" (also co-writer)
1976	Ringo's Rotogravure	Ringo Starr	writer/piano on "Cookin' (In the Kitchen of Love)"
1980	John Lennon for President	David Peel and the Lower East Side	producer
1981	"Walking on Thin Ice"	Yoko Ono	producer, guitar

== See also ==
- The Beatles albums discography
- The Beatles singles discography
- A Toot and a Snore in '74
