= Power to the People (box set) =

Album box set by John Lennon and Yoko Ono

Box set by John Lennon and Yoko Ono/Plastic Ono Band with Elephant's Memory and various artists
- Released: 10 October 2025
- Recorded: One to One Concert: 30 August 1972 New York City: December 1971 – 20 March 1972
- Venues: Madison Square Garden, New York City
- Genre: Rock
- Label: Mercury
- Producer: Sean Ono Lennon

John Lennon chronology
Gimme Some Truth. The Ultimate Mixes (2020)	Power to the People (2025)

Power to the People is a box set by John Lennon and Yoko Ono released on 10 October 2025 through Mercury Records. The box showcases Lennon and Ono's historic 1972 One to One concerts at Madison Square Garden, New York City.

The project received generally favorable reviews, although it was criticized for the absence of the song "Woman Is the Nigger of the World" contained in the original album Some Time in New York City. Commercially, the box charted in several international charts including a top-ten debut on the German Album Chart.

== Description ==
The box set includes 9 CDs, 3 Blu-rays, a 204-page book, and 31 live tracks from Lennon and Ono's two sets at the One to One Concert backed by the Plastic Ono Band, Elephant's Memory and special guests at Madison Square Garden, New York City, on 30 August 1972. It features 92 bonus tracks.

The album is also available in one and two disc CD editions, containing just the concerts.

== Critical reception ==
Professional ratings
Aggregate scores
Source	Rating
Metacritic	75/100
Review scores
Source	Rating
Loudersound	2/5 stars
Mojo	4/5 stars
Pitchfork	6.0/10
Rockol	9.0/10
Rolling Stone	4/5 stars
Uncut	4/5 stars

The project received generally favorable reviews by critics. On review aggregator Metacritic, Power to the People (box set) received a score of 75 out of 100 based on 5 reviews.

In a positive review Tom Doyle of Mojo reported that "the reworkings of the original studio tracks that are the main draw here, and a great example of what these box sets do best: rescuing cultural artifacts, carefully restoring them and illuminating them from new and fascinating angles". Stephen Thomas Erlewine of Pitchfork described the box as a "a vivid document of that brief period when Lennon and Ono reinvented themselves as radicals".

In a mixed review by David Quantick of Loudersound : "once you strip away the flim and the flam, you are left with some reasonably good live music, some intriguing demos arguably the best material" and Some Time in New York City, "an album that suffers from being terrible and the omission of its one great song "Woman Is the Nigger of the World", whose title means it has been excised from the album."

== Track listing ==
Disc one: The One to One Concert • Hybrid 'Best of' Show
No.	Title	Writer(s)	Show	Length
1.	"Power to the People (Intro)"	John Lennon	Evening
2.	"New York City"	Lennon	Afternoon
3.	"It's So Hard"	Lennon	Afternoon
4.	"Move on Fast"	Yoko Ono	Afternoon
5.	"Well Well Well"	Lennon	Evening
6.	"Born in a Prison"	Ono	Afternoon
7.	"Instant Karma! (We All Shine On)"	Lennon	Afternoon
8.	"Mother"	Lennon	Afternoon
9.	"We're All Water"	Ono	Evening
10.	"Come Together"	Lennon–McCartney	Evening
11.	"Imagine"	Lennon; Ono	Afternoon
12.	"Open Your Box"	Ono	Afternoon
13.	"Cold Turkey"	Lennon	Afternoon
14.	"Don't Worry Kyoko (Mummy's Only Looking for a Hand in the Snow)"	Ono	Afternoon
15.	"Hound Dog"	Jerry Leiber; Mike Stoller	Evening
16.	"Law and Order"	Lennon	Evening
17.	"Give Peace a Chance"	Lennon	Evening

Disc two: The One to One Concert • Afternoon Show
No.	Title	Writer(s)	Length
1.	"Power to the People (Intro)"	Lennon	0:35
2.	"New York City"	Lennon	4:23
3.	"It's So Hard"	Lennon	3:10
4.	"Move On Fast"	Ono	4:01
5.	"Well Well Well"	Lennon	5:42
6.	"Born in a Prison"	Ono	5:11
7.	"Instant Karma! (We All Shine On)"	Lennon	3:36
8.	"Mother"	Lennon	5:30
9.	"We're All Water"	Ono	6:00
10.	"Come Together"	Lennon–McCartney	4:40
11.	"Imagine"	Lennon; Ono	3:32
12.	"Open Your Box"	Ono	4:19
13.	"Cold Turkey"	Lennon	6:01
14.	"Don't Worry Kyoko (Mummy's Only Looking for a Hand in the Snow)"	Ono	4:37
15.	"Hound Dog"	Leiber; Stoller	3:57

Disc three: The One to One Concert • Evening Show
No.	Title	Writer(s)	Length
1.	"Power to the People (Intro)"	Lennon	1:01
2.	"New York City"	Lennon	4:30
3.	"It's So Hard"	Lennon	3:16
4.	"Move On Fast"	Ono	4:12
5.	"Well Well Well"	Lennon	6:08
6.	"Instant Karma! (We All Shine On)"	Lennon	3:48
7.	"Mother"	Lennon	5:47
8.	"We're All Water"	Ono	6:13
9.	"Born in a Prison"	Ono	4:55
10.	"Come Together"	Lennon–McCartney	4:45
11.	"Imagine"	Lennon; Ono	3:56
12.	"Open Your Box"	Ono	5:27
13.	"Cold Turkey"	Lennon	6:38
14.	"Hound Dog"	Leiber; Stoller	3:04
15.	"Law and Order"	Lennon	2:17
16.	"Give Peace a Chance"	Lennon	10:38

Disc four: New York City (The Ultimate Mixes)
No.	Title	Writer(s)	Length
1.	"New York City"	Lennon	4:40
2.	"Sisters, O Sisters"	Ono	3:45
3.	"Attica State"	Lennon; Ono	2:54
4.	"Born in a Prison"	Ono	4:04
5.	"Sunday Bloody Sunday"	Lennon; Ono	6:47
6.	"The Luck of the Irish"	Lennon; Ono	3:03
7.	"John Sinclair"	Lennon	5:12
8.	"Angela"	Lennon; Ono	4:04
9.	"We're All Water"	Ono	7:12

Disc five: New York City (The Evolution Documentary)
No.	Title	Writer(s)	Length
1.	"New York City"	Lennon	5:49
2.	"Sisters, O Sisters"	Ono	7:58
3.	"Attica State"	Lennon; Ono	8:10
4.	"Born in a Prison"	Ono	6:29
5.	"Sunday Bloody Sunday"	Lennon; Ono	8:26
6.	"The Luck of the Irish"	Lennon; Ono	8:33
7.	"John Sinclair"	Lennon	6:57
8.	"Angela"	Lennon; Ono	7:49
9.	"We're All Water"	Ono	2:29

Disc six New York City (Studio Jam)
No.	Title	Writer(s)	Length
1.	"Jazz Freakout"	Lennon; Ono; Jim Keltner; Stan Bronstein; Wayne "Tex" Gabriel; Adam Ippolito; Gary Van Syoc; Richard Frank Jr.	1:40
2.	"You Can't Sit Down"	Cornell Muldrow; Dee Clark; Kal Mann	1:58
3.	"Roll Over Beethoven"	Chuck Berry	3:06
4.	"Honey, Don't!"	Carl Perkins	3:03
5.	"Ain't That a Shame"	Fats Domino; Dave Bartholomew	2:31
6.	"My Babe"	Willie Dixon	2:40
7.	"Send Me Some Lovin'"	John Marascalco; Leo Price	2:39
8.	"Fools Like Me"	Murphy "Pee Wee" Maddox; Jack Clement	0:41
9.	"Down in the Caribbean"	Mitchell Torok	3:15
10.	"Happy Birthday Yoko Ono"	Bronstein; Gabriel; Ippolito; Scyoc; Frank Jr.	2:51
11.	"That's Right"	Perkins; Johnny Cash	0:45
12.	"Don't Be Cruel / Hound Dog"	Otis Blackwell; Elvis Presley / Leiber; Stoller	4:30
13.	"Yoko's Rhythm"	Ono	2:21
14.	"Whole Lotta Shakin' / It'll Be Me"	Dave "Curlee" Williams / Clement	5:34
15.	"Yakety Yak"	Leiber; Stoller	2:10
16.	"Road Runner"	Bo Diddley	0:38

New York City (The Elements Mixes)
No.	Title	Writer(s)	Length
17.	"Sisters, O Sisters"	Ono	3:01
18.	"Born in a Prison"	Ono	4:43
19.	"The Luck of the Irish"	Lennon; Ono	2:37
20.	"Angela"	Lennon; Ono	4:03

Disc seven: Live Jam John & Yoko / Plastic Ono Band and a Star Studded Cast of Thousands – Peace and Love for Christmas, in aid of UNICEF (Live at the Lyceum Ballroom, The Strand, London, 15 December 1969)
No.	Title	Writer(s)	Length
1.	"Cold Turkey"	Lennon	8:29
2.	"Don't Worry Kyoko (Mummy's Only Looking for a Hand in the Snow)"	Ono	14:59

John & Yoko / Plastic Ono Band with Frank Zappa and The Mothers (Fillmore East, New York, 6 June 1971)
No.	Title	Writer(s)	Length
3.	"Well (Baby Please Don't Go)"	Walter Ward	7:23
4.	"Jamrag (Say Please / King Kong / Aawk)"	Lennon; Ono; Frank Zappa	5:47
5.	"Scumbag"	Lennon; Ono; Zappa; Howard Kaylan	4:26
6.	"Aü" (aka "A Small Eternity with Yoko Ono")	Lennon; Ono	7:36

Disc eight: Live Jam 2 John Sinclair Freedom Rally (Crisler Arena, Ann Arbor, Michigan, 10 December 1971)
No.	Title	Writer(s)	Length
1.	"Attica State"	Lennon; Ono	3:12
2.	"The Luck of the Irish"	Lennon; Ono	3:27
3.	"Sisters, O Sisters"	Ono	3:50
4.	"John Sinclair"	Lennon	3:59

Benefit for the families of the victims of the riot at Attica State Correctional Facility (Apollo Theater, Harlem, NYC, 17 December 1971)
No.	Title	Writer(s)	Length
5.	"Attica State"	Lennon; Ono	4:15
6.	"Sisters, O Sisters"	Ono	3:54
7.	"Imagine"	Lennon; Ono	3:37

David Frost TV Show (The Little Theatre, 240 West 44th Street, NYC, 16 December 1971)
No.	Title	Writer(s)	Length
8.	"Attica State"	Lennon; Ono	3:09
9.	"Sisters, O Sisters"	Ono	3:01
10.	"John Sinclair"	Lennon	2:38

Jerry Lewis Muscular Dystrophy Telethon (Americana Hotel, NYC, 4 September 1972)
No.	Title	Writer(s)	Length
11.	"Imagine"	Lennon; Ono	3:50
12.	"Now or Never"	Ono	4:20
13.	"Give Peace a Chance"	Lennon	7:21

Disc 9: Home Jam

Home Recordings at the St. Regis Hotel, New York, 10 September 1971

1. "Shazam"
2. "Honey, Don't!"
3. "Glad All Over"
4. "Lend Me Your Comb"
5. "Wake Up Little Susie"
6. "New York City"
7. "Wake Up Little Susie"
8. "'Hey, que pasa?'"
9. "(You're So Square) Baby I Don't Care"
10. "Vacation Time"
11. "Heartbeat"
12. "Peggy Sue Got Married"
13. "Peggy Sue"
14. "'Phone Call from Henry Gotsello'"
15. "Peggy Sue"
16. "'Now we'd like to change the mood a little...'"
17. "Maybe Baby"
18. "Mailman, Bring Me No More Blues"
19. "Rave On!"
20. "Twelve Bar Blues"

Home Recordings at the St. Regis Hotel, New York, 27 October 1971

1. "I Got You"
2. "Hi-Heel Sneakers"
3. "Slippin' and Slidin'"
4. "Gone from This Place"

Home Recordings at Campus Inn, Ann Arbor, Michigan, 10 December 1971

1. "Send Me Some Lovin'"
2. "He Got the Blues"
3. "When the Teacher"
4. "Pill"
5. "It's Real"

John Lennon with Phil Ochs

1. "I Ain't Marching Anymore"
2. "Joe Hill"
3. "Chords of Fame"
4. "Ringing of Revolution"

Blu-rays

The three Blu-rays repeat all the content on the nine CDs. Some of the content is presented in two different stereo formats: 5.1 Surround and Dolby Atmos. There is no visual content on them.

== Charts ==
Chart performance for Power to the People
Chart (2025)	Peak position
Austrian Albums (Ö3 Austria)	16
Belgian Albums (Ultratop Flanders)	28
Belgian Albums (Ultratop Wallonia)	99
Dutch Albums (Album Top 100)	27
French Albums (SNEP)	138
French Rock & Metal Albums (SNEP)	8
German Albums (Offizielle Top 100)	9
German Rock & Metal Albums (Offizielle Top 100)	1
Japanese Albums (Oricon)	28
Japanese Download Albums (Billboard Japan)	91
Japanese Rock Albums (Oricon)	5
Japanese Top Albums Sales (Billboard Japan)	19
Norwegian Physical Albums (IFPI Norge)	4
Scottish Albums (Official Charts)	7
Swedish Physical Albums (Sverigetopplistan)	16
Swiss Albums (Schweizer Hitparade)	30
UK Albums (Official Charts)	72
US Top Album Sales (Billboard)	23

== See also ==
- Live in New York City (John Lennon album) - First Live and Video album of the concert released in 1986
- One to One: John & Yoko - 2024 Documentary film centering around the concert
