= Attica State (song) =

Song by John Lennon and Yoko Ono as Plastic Ono Band

from the album Some Time in New York City
- Published: Northern Songs
- Released: 12 June 1972 (US); 15 September 1972 (UK)
- Recorded: Studio: November 1971 – March 1972
- Genre: Rock, blues rock
- Length: 2:54
- Label: Apple/EMI
- Songwriters: John Lennon, Yoko Ono
- Producers: John Lennon, Yoko Ono and Phil Spector

Some Time in New York City track listing
- 16 tracks Side one: 1. "Woman Is the Nigger of the World"; 2. "Sisters, O Sisters"; 3. "Attica State"; 4. "Born in a Prison"; 5. "New York City"; Side two: 6. "Sunday Bloody Sunday"; 7. "The Luck of the Irish"; 8. "John Sinclair"; 9. "Angela"; 10. "We're All Water"; Side three: 11. "Cold Turkey"; 12. "Don't Worry Kyoko"; Side four: 13. "Well (Baby Please Don't Go)"; 14. "Jamrag"; 15. "Scumbag"; 16. "Au"

"Attica State" is a song by John Lennon and Yoko Ono as Plastic Ono Band. It appeared on the album Some Time in New York City. The song is a lamentation of the loss of life in the Attica State prison riots, as well as the poor living conditions and human rights prisoners are afforded in the United States.

"Attica State" was also intended as the b-side of the lead single from Some Time in New York City, which was to have been "The Luck of the Irish." The intended single was given catalogue number APPLE 1846 but was cancelled before being released.

== Background ==
The song was conceived on Lennon's 31st birthday, 9 October 1971, where his friends, including Ringo Starr, Maureen Starkey, Phil Spector, Klaus Voormann, Mal Evans, Neil Aspinall, Eric Clapton, Allen Ginsberg and Jim Keltner, threw Lennon a party and participated in a sing-along. One of the songs they sang was an ad-libbed version of "Attica State." The riots had occurred only weeks beforehand.

The song's lyrics take sympathy of the prisoners killed in the riots, though they regret the loss of all life. Lennon and Ono also issued a scathing condemnation of the American judicial and penal system with such lyrics as "Free the prisoners, jail the judges," "They all live in suffocation," and "Rockefeller pulled the trigger, that is what the people feel." The final verse calls on its audience to "Come together, join the movement / Take a stand for human rights / Fear and hatred clouds our judgment / Free us all from endless night."

Lennon first performed the song live at a rally for John Sinclair on 10 December 1971. This version was released on the soundtrack to The U.S. vs. John Lennon. One week later, he performed the song at a benefit concert for the families of those killed in the riots, which took place at the Apollo Theater in New York. This performance was released on the 1998 John Lennon Anthology box set.

Classic Rock critic Rob Hughes rated "Attica State" as Lennon's 10th best political song. Ultimate Classic Rock critic Nick DeRiso rated it as Lennon's 10th greatest solo political song, an impassioned call for more humane treatment of prisoners everywhere while issuing a series of scorching condemnations aimed at the U.S. judicial system."

Coincidentally, Lennon's murderer, Mark David Chapman, was incarcerated in Attica Correctional Facility on a life sentence from 1981 until 2012, when he was moved to Wende Correctional Facility.

== Personnel ==
Personnel on the Some Time in New York City recording are:

- John Lennon – Vocals, Guitar
- Yoko Ono – Vocals
- Wayne 'Tex' Gabriel – guitar
- Stan Bronstein – Saxophone
- Gary Van Scyoc – Bass
- Adam Ippolito – Piano, Organ
- Richard Frank Jr. – Drums, Percussion
- Jim Keltner – Drums

== See also ==
- Attica Prison riot in popular culture
