= Sunday Bloody Sunday (John Lennon and Yoko Ono song) =

Song by John Lennon and Yoko Ono as Plastic Ono Band

from the album Some Time in New York City
- Released: 12 June 1972 (US); 15 September 1972 (UK)
- Recorded: 1972
- Length: 5:00
- Label: Apple/EMI
- Songwriter: John Lennon
- Producers: John Lennon; Yoko Ono; Phil Spector

Some Time in New York City track listing
- 16 tracks Side one: 1. "Woman Is the Nigger of the World"; 2. "Sisters, O Sisters"; 3. "Attica State"; 4. "Born in a Prison"; 5. "New York City"; Side two: 6. "Sunday Bloody Sunday"; 7. "The Luck of the Irish"; 8. "John Sinclair"; 9. "Angela"; 10. "We're All Water"; Side three: 11. "Cold Turkey"; 12. "Don't Worry Kyoko"; Side four: 13. "Well (Baby Please Don't Go)"; 14. "Jamrag"; 15. "Scumbag"; 16. "Au"

"Sunday Bloody Sunday" is a song written by John Lennon and Yoko Ono that was first released on their 1972 Plastic Ono Band album with Elephant's Memory, Some Time in New York City. The song addresses the Bloody Sunday massacre of 1972 and is one of two on the album that addresses the contemporary Northern Ireland conflict, "The Luck of the Irish" being the other.

== Background ==
Lennon had sympathies for the Roman Catholic Irish minority in Northern Ireland and had joined a protest in London on 11 August 1971 that attempted to pressure the British government into removing its troops from Northern Ireland, shortly before Lennon moved to New York. On 30 January 1972 at a protest march in Derry, 13 marchers were killed by members of the 1st Battalion, Parachute Regiment. The killing was quickly dubbed "Bloody Sunday". Lennon, who was living in New York at the time, was enraged by the massacre and wrote "Sunday Bloody Sunday" as an angry response.

== Lyrics and music ==
The lyrics of "Sunday Bloody Sunday" express Lennon's anger. Ben Urish and Ken Bielen explain that the lyrics "start off with some nice rhetorical spins and a modicum of insight" but eventually devolve into "lyrical hyperbole" as Lennon's anger takes over. Beatles biographer John Blaney felt that Lennon's need to express his disgust at the incident caused him to write a song that is "a piece of pro-Republican propaganda that ignored the historical facts in favour of emotional blackmail". Music critic Paul du Noyer similarly described the refrains as being too simplistic to address the complexity of the longstanding Irish-British problems, although he acknowledged that they were "heartfelt". Among the controversial lyrics are suggestions that the "Anglo pigs and Scotties" need to go home and the reference to concentration camps (Long Kesh was commonly compared to a concentration camp amongst contemporary critics of the Government's internment policy). The lyrics also express the wish that Falls Road, Belfast should be free forever at a time when the Falls Road Curfew was still in recent memory. Music critic Johnny Rogan finds "unintended polemic humour" in the verse:

You anglo pigs and scotties
Sent to colonise the North
You wave your bloody Union Jacks
And you know what it's worth
How dare you hold to ransom
A people proud and free
Keep Ireland for the Irish
Put the English back to sea.

Lennon explained the lyrical polemics to New Musical Express journalist Roy Carr as:

Here I am in New York and I hear about the 13 people shot dead in Ireland and I react immediately. And being what I am I react in four-to-the-bar with a guitar break in the middle. I don't say "My God, what's happening? We should do something." I go "It's Sunday Bloody Sunday and they shot the people down." It's all over now. It's gone. My songs are not there to be digested and pulled apart like the Mona Lisa. If people on the street think about it, that's all there is to it.

Rogan feels that the melody "left a lot to be desired". But Urish and Bielen describe the music as "suitably chaotic and rambunctious" to the message. Beatle historian Bruce Spizer describes the "heavy drums and percussion" as giving the song "a reggae-styled military march sound". The instrumental parts include "wailing" guitars and saxophones played, respectively, by Lennon and Elephant's Memory's Stan Bronstein, both of which Spizer finds "weak". Ono screeches the words "Sunday Bloody Sunday" as background vocals to the refrain, in a manner that Rogan considers "distracting" but Urish and Bielen find "emotionally appropriate" and Uncut writer John Lewis finds particularly effective. The song has a false ending where the song appears to fade out but then returns, similar to the effect at the end of the Beatles' "Strawberry Fields Forever". Urish and Bielen consider this an effective means of "reminding listeners that the tragedy continues even when not the focus of attention and will not go away on its own" but Beatle biographers Chip Madinger and Mark Easter feel that effect was better used on "Strawberry Fields Forever". Producer Phil Spector applied his wall of sound approach to the song to create a dense production.

== Reception ==
Although Urish and Bielen praise many aspects of the song, they do not feel it quite succeeds. Besides criticising the hyperbole of the later lyrics, they also feel that Lennon detracts from his message when without reason he uses Brooklyn pronunciations of "learn" as "loyn", "burn" as "boyn" and "turn" as "toyn" in one of the verses. Lewis also provides a mixed assessment, stating that even Sinn Féin's Martin McGuinness "might blanche at some of the assertions," the song is "helped by a spirited funk rock jam, where Yoko's eerie banshee wail on the chorus conjures up curious similarities with The Specials' "Ghost Town". The Beatles Bible considers the song a "powerful rocker". Rogan concludes that the song "remains a stirring and salutary comment on the limitations of agitprop. He also regrets that Lennon couldn't get together with former partner Paul McCartney, who wrote a "simplistic and sentimental" song about the same events, "Give Ireland Back to the Irish," so that the two could together write a "decent anthem". Creem critic Dave Marsh preferred "Sunday Bloody Sunday" to "Give Ireland Back to the Irish" due to its more exciting music, but felt that Ringo Starr's "Back Off Boogaloo" was "a better statement on the subject than either". Besides feeling that it was over simplistic, Blaney felt that the lyrics supporting the Irish Republican movement were hypocritical given the movement's own history of violence and Lennon's prior expressed commitment to pacifism. Du Noyer commented that Lennon's "topical punditry was not the equal of lasting art" and noted that the song has been largely forgotten in light of U2's "more thoughtful" song with the same title. Madinger and Easter similarly consider U2's song to be "superior". Lennon biographer Jon Wiener regarded the song as a "failure".

According to Carr and fellow NME writer Tony Tyler, Lennon's prestige in England nosedived as a result of the song's accusations of genocide. Journalist Robin Denselow criticised the lyrics of both of Lennon's Irish-themed songs on Some Time in New York City in 1989, and accused Lennon of racism.

Lennon donated the royalties from "Sunday Bloody Sunday" to the civil rights movement in Northern Ireland.

== Personnel ==
The personnel on the recording were:

- John Lennon – Vocals, guitar
- Yoko Ono – Vocals
- Wayne 'Tex' Gabriel – Guitar
- Stan Bronstein – Saxophone
- Gary Van Scyoc – Bass
- Adam Ippolito – Piano, organ
- Richard Frank Jr. – Drums, percussion
- Jim Keltner – Drums

== Covers ==
The song was covered by the Irish nationalist band The Wolfe Tones on their 2004 album The Troubles. Many of the lyrics were toned down (e.g. references to "English pigs" and "concentration camps" were cut out), and the last verse was replaced with a verse that called on the British Government to apologise for its treatment of Ireland over time.
