= Born in a Prison =

Song by John Lennon and Yoko Ono

from the album Some Time in New York City
- Released: 12 June 1972 (US); 15 September 1972 (UK)
- Recorded: 1972
- Genre: Rock
- Length: 4:05
- Label: Apple/EMI
- Songwriter: Yoko Ono
- Producers: John Lennon; Yoko Ono; Phil Spector

Some Time in New York City track listing
- 16 tracks Side one: 1. "Woman Is the Nigger of the World"; 2. "Sisters, O Sisters"; 3. "Attica State"; 4. "Born in a Prison"; 5. "New York City"; Side two: 6. "Sunday Bloody Sunday"; 7. "The Luck of the Irish"; 8. "John Sinclair"; 9. "Angela"; 10. "We're All Water"; Side three: 11. "Cold Turkey"; 12. "Don't Worry Kyoko"; Side four: 13. "Well (Baby Please Don't Go)"; 14. "Jamrag"; 15. "Scumbag"; 16. "Au"

"Born in a Prison" is a song written by Yoko Ono and first released on her 1972 album with John Lennon Some Time in New York City as part of their Plastic Ono Band project.

== Lyrics and music ==
The lyrics to "Born in a Prison" use prison as a metaphor for the constraints society places on individuals. To music critic Johnny Rogan, the song reiterates themes from Lennon's earlier song "Working Class Hero" and equates all of life to a prison sentence. Author John Blaney gives an alternative view that with "Born in a Prison", Ono abandons the abstract metaphors of her earlier work, feeling that the song represents "simple leftist dogma". Cinema professor Jonathan Kahana claims that with lyrics such as "born in a prison/raised in a prison/sent to a prison called school," the song anticipates the disciplinary institutions suggested by Michel Foucault in works such as 1975's Discipline and Punish. In the verses, the lyrics complain about how humans are constrained by unjust social conventions which not only limit individuals, but also the society that imposes the constraints. Blaney finds the verses full of despair, replacing Ono's earlier ability to imagine a better world with a view that human existence is meaningless. But the refrain provides some hope:

Wood becomes a flute when it's loved
Reach for yourself and your battered mates
Mirror becomes a razor when it's broken
Look in the mirror and see your shattered fate

To Kahana, this suggests that institutions can be transformed just as objects can, although when making these transformations it is critical to "use both love and violence creatively".

On Some Time in New York City, Ono provides the lead vocals with Lennon providing harmony during the refrain. Lennon also plays guitar, Jim Keltner plays drums, and Elephant's Memory provides the remaining backing instruments. The song is particularly propelled by the saxophone playing of Elephant's Memory's Stan Bronstein, which links the verses, and which Rogan describes as "creating a cocktail lounge feel".

== Critical reception ==
Critical reaction to "Born in a Prison" has been sharply divided. Authors Ken Bielen and Ben Urish claim that the song makes "good poetic use of the prison metaphor" and that it is not just one of the best songs on Some Time in New York City but "one of Ono's better tracks from this phase of her career". Rogan describes it as sounding "musically out of sync with the work of any other major performer of the period", but that it "provides an interesting compliment" to the rest of the Some Time in New York City album. Kahana praises it for being more interesting than the previous song on the album, "Attica State", which also used the prison theme and was co-written by Ono and Lennon. Allmusic critic Bruce Eder praises the song for "possessing a strange pop ambience".

However, Blaney criticizes the song for negating the Lennons' earlier positive vibrations with this "negative commentary on the human condition". Beatles authors Chip Madinger and Mark Easter call the song "contemptible", claiming it would be suitable for the 1960s girl group The Shaggs. Lennon biographer Jon Wiener calls "Born in a Prison" "painfully weak". Of the live version released on video, United Press International reported that it "is so awful it is embarrassing to watch".

== Other versions ==
"Born in a Prison" was included in Lennon's and Ono's benefit concerts on 30 August 1972 at Madison Square Garden in New York City. The song was not included on the concert CD Live in New York City, but the afternoon performance was included on the video. On the video, the song was moved from its original position between "Well Well Well" and "Instant Karma!" to later in the program. Ono considers this performance "a nice exchange between John and I".

== Personnel ==
Personal on the Some Time in New York City recording are:

- Yoko Ono – vocals
- John Lennon – vocals, guitar
- Wayne 'Tex' Gabriel – guitar
- Stan Bronstein – saxophone
- Gary Van Scyoc – bass guitar
- Adam Ippolito – piano, organ
- John La Bosca – piano
- Richard Frank Jr. – drums, percussion
- Jim Keltner – drums
