= New York City (John Lennon and Yoko Ono song) =

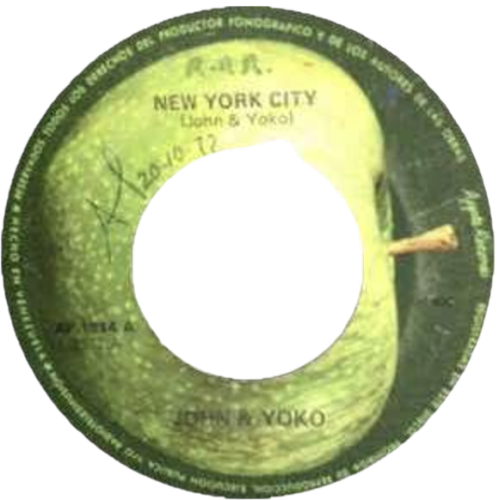
- 1972 Venezuelan single label

Song by John Lennon and Yoko Ono as Plastic Ono Band

from the album Some Time in New York City
- Released: 12 June 1972 (US); 15 September 1972 (UK)
- Recorded: 1972
- Genre: Blues rock; hard rock; rock and roll
- Length: 4:32
- Label: Apple/EMI
- Songwriter: John Lennon
- Producers: John Lennon, Yoko Ono and Phil Spector

Some Time in New York City track listing
- 16 tracks Side one: 1. "Woman Is the Nigger of the World"; 2. "Sisters, O Sisters"; 3. "Attica State"; 4. "Born in a Prison"; 5. "New York City"; Side two: 6. "Sunday Bloody Sunday"; 7. "The Luck of the Irish"; 8. "John Sinclair"; 9. "Angela"; 10. "We're All Water"; Side three: 11. "Cold Turkey"; 12. "Don't Worry Kyoko"; Side four: 13. "Well (Baby Please Don't Go)"; 14. "Jamrag"; 15. "Scumbag"; 16. "Au"

"New York City" is a song written by John Lennon that was first released on Lennon's and Yoko Ono's 1972 Plastic Ono Band album Some Time in New York City.

== Writing and recording ==
"New York City" was inspired by Lennon's move to New York City and by the people he met in the city. He began writing the song soon after moving there in 1971, and a few weeks after his move he had completed the first verse, although the rest of the song was only a sketch. An early version was used in Lennon's and Ono's film Clock, which was filmed in September 1971. That version relied more prominently on the "que pasa" lyrics than the final version. Lennon continued to expand the lyrics and make demo recordings of the song, including an acoustic version from late 1971 which was included on John Lennon Anthology. The final version released on the album was recorded in 1972 with Plastic Ono Band Elephant's Memory on the backing instruments.

== Lyrics and music ==
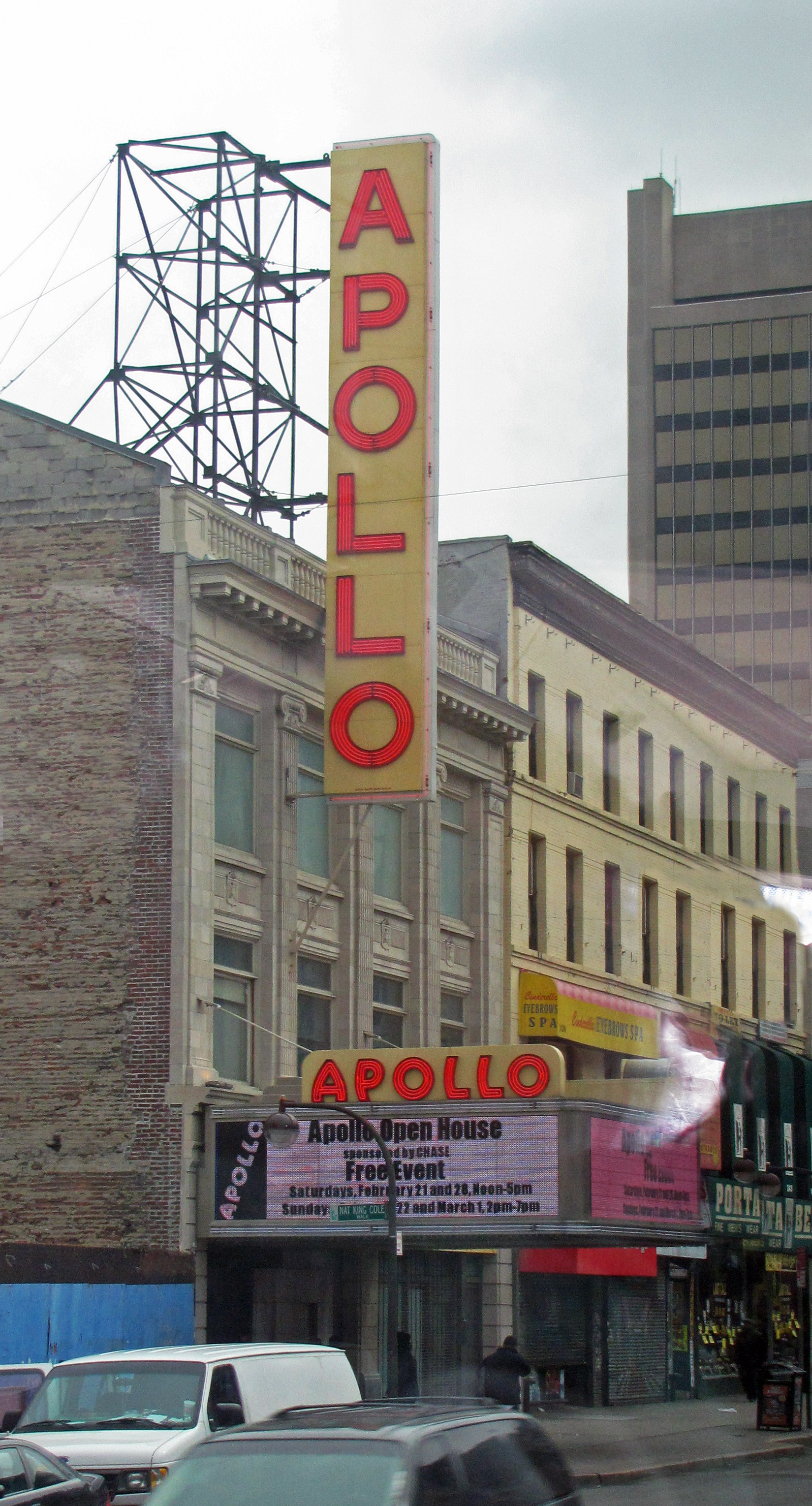
John Lennon sings about his benefit concert at the Apollo Theater in "New York City."

"New York City" is in some ways a sequel to "The Ballad of John and Yoko," a song Lennon wrote and performed with the Beatles. Like the earlier Beatles' song, "New York City" gives a straightforward report of the recent events in Lennon's life. Among the events included are Lennon's meeting with street musician David Peel, his concert with Frank Zappa at the Fillmore East, meeting Elephant's Memory, his Attica State Prison benefit concert at the Apollo Theater, and his visit to Max's Kansas City.

The song also refers to Lennon's immigration issues. In response to the US government trying to deport him from the country, Lennon retorts that he'll live in New York whether they like it or not, and that "the Statue of Liberty said come." The song concludes with Lennon incorporating a bit of New York City vernacular with the statement "what a bad ass city."

Music critic Johnny Rogan claims that "the melody sounds like a direct lift from 'The Ballad of John and Yoko.'" Music critic Paul Du Noyer describes "New York City" as a "solid, rousing rocker." Music critic Paul Blaney describes it as "a rough and tumble rocker" and a "dense exciting street rocker." Lennon is backed by Elephant's Memory, whose provide a brassy sound. Beatles expert Bruce Spizer describes Lennon's guitar playing as being in "Chuck Berry style."

== Critical reception ==
According to Du Noyer, Lennon performs "New York City" with a "boisterous drive that testifies to the new lease on life that the Big Apple had given him." Blaney calls it "the highlight" of Some Time in New York City. Beatles expert Bruce Spizer agrees that it is "the album's best song." Authors Chip Madinger and Mark Easter similarly call "New York City" "the best rocker" on Some Time in New York City. AllMusic critic Bruce Eder claims that the song has "some of the best electric guitar ever heard on a Lennon album." Rogan claims that Lennon successfully "transforms a political rant into a rock 'n' roll boogie," and particularly praises the "rollicking" piano, the tenor sax and the "excited abandonment" of Lennon's vocals. Authors Ken Bielen and Ben Urish felt that the song could have sold well as a single." Ultimate Classic Rock critic Nick DeRiso called "New York City" the most underrated song on Some Time in New York City, describing it as "a Chuck Berry-esque mash note to Lennon's new hometown, an effortless romp on an LP sorely lacking such moments."

== Other versions ==
Lennon used "New York City" to open his benefit concerts on 30 August 1972 at Madison Square Garden in New York City. The afternoon performance was included on the live album Live in New York City. Rogan calls this version "stirring" but notes that on the album the song loses some power due to the vocal being mixed too low at times. Bielen and Urish call this version "rousing" and claim it makes them wonder why the song was not released as a single at the time.

"New York City" was edited down to a one-minute segment intended for use in the film Imagine: John Lennon for scenes in which Lennon and Ono were in New York City. The segment was included on a work print of the film from 11 February 1988 but was excluded from the final release of the film.

== Influences ==
David Peel and his meeting with John Lennon are among the topics of "New York City." Peel also wrote a similar song, "The Ballad of New York City (John Lennon–Yoko Ono)."

Two acts associated with Lennon at the time of the song's release recorded related songs about Lennon and Ono around the same time. David Peel, who is name checked in "New York City," recorded a companion piece, "The Ballad of New York City (John Lennon–Yoko Ono)" on his 1972 album The Pope Smokes Dope, produced by Lennon and Ono. Elephant's Memory, who provided the backing music for "New York City," also recorded a companion song "Local Plastic Ono Band" on their 1972 album Elephant's Memory, also produced by Lennon and Ono. Bielen and Urish claim that two other songs on the Elephant's Memory album, "Power Boogie" and "Liberation Special," are powerful rockers reminiscent of "New York City."

== Personnel ==
Personnel on the Some Time in New York City recording are:

- John Lennon – vocals, guitar
- Wayne 'Tex' Gabriel – guitar
- Stan Bronstein – saxophone
- Gary Van Scyoc – bass
- Adam Ippolito – piano, organ
- Richard Frank Jr. – drums, percussion
- Jim Keltner – drums
