= We're All Water =

Song by John Lennon and Yoko Ono as Plastic Ono Band

from the album Some Time in New York City
- Released: 12 June 1972 (US); 15 September 1972 (UK)
- Recorded: 1972
- Genre: Rock
- Length: 7:11
- Label: Apple/EMI
- Songwriter: Yoko Ono
- Producers: John Lennon; Yoko Ono; Phil Spector

Some Time in New York City track listing
- 16 tracks Side one: 1. "Woman Is the Nigger of the World"; 2. "Sisters, O Sisters"; 3. "Attica State"; 4. "Born in a Prison"; 5. "New York City"; Side two: 6. "Sunday Bloody Sunday"; 7. "The Luck of the Irish"; 8. "John Sinclair"; 9. "Angela"; 10. "We're All Water"; Side three: 11. "Cold Turkey"; 12. "Don't Worry Kyoko"; Side four: 13. "Well (Baby Please Don't Go)"; 14. "Jamrag"; 15. "Scumbag"; 16. "Au"

"We're All Water" is a song written by Yoko Ono that was first released on the 1972 John Lennon and Yoko Ono Plastic Ono Band album Some Time in New York City. It was the last song on the first record of the album, and the last song on the album that was recorded in the studio (the second record was live).

== Lyrics and music ==
Ono sings the lead vocal. The lyrics of "We're All Water" describe all people as being essentially the same, despite their apparent differences. Some of the lyrics were adapted from "Water Talk," a poem Ono had written in 1967 that also used the simile of people being like water. According to Beatles biographer John Blaney, Ono believed that water had mystical properties and has the ability to "bring about physical change or social unity." As a result, Ono had used water as a theme of other art works, including her 1971 exhibition This is Not Here where the audience was invited to produce a water sculpture that Ono would work on as well, establishing a unity between artist and audience.

The song begins by stating that then-US president Richard Nixon and then-Chinese dictator Mao Zedong would not be very different if they were stripped naked. The song later states that mass-murderer Charles Manson and the Pope may be similar if "we press their smiles." Other celebrities who get compared include deceased actress Marilyn Monroe with deceased comedian Lenny Bruce, actress Raquel Welch with political activist Jerry Rubin, and Black Panther leader Eldridge Cleaver with Queen Elizabeth II. The lyrics also point out the similarity between the listener and then-New York governor Nelson Rockefeller and with the singer. In one verse the song moves away from comparing people and instead suggests that the US president's residence, the White House, and the Great Hall of the People in China would also not be very different "if we count their windows." Ono had first suggested counting windows of buildings in her 1964 book Grapefruit.

In the chorus, Ono sings that "we're all water" and that "we'll all evaporate together," suggesting that even any differences that there are between different people will disappear when we die. In the fadeout to the song Ono makes the song's theme even more explicit singing "What's the difference?" and "There's no difference."

Music critic Johnny Rogan did not consider the song's melody to be particularly memorable, but he found the backing music to be "hilarious." He feels that the "rasping" saxophone played by Stan Bronstein of Elephant's Memory and Ono's "vocal exclamations" generate a sound that captures the spirit of Johnny and the Hurricanes. Ben Urish and Ken Bielen say that the band plays a "staccato beat" during the fadeout.

== Reception ==
Creem critic Dave Marsh described "We're All Water" as a "cosmic rocker" and claimed that it was possibly the best song on Some Time in New York City and among the Plastic Ono Band's best work. He also gives the song as an example of where Ono began to "figure out how to effectively apply her ideas to Western music." Urish and Bielen call it "one of the better transferences of [Ono's] conceptual art instructions into song lyrics" and they also praise the "high energy" backing music and Ono's "playful yet serious" lyrics and vocal performance. Rogan considered it to be "a suitable romp" for ending the studio record of Some Time in New York City. Lennon biographer Jonathan Cott considers "We're All Water" to be the highlight of Some Time in New York City. On the other hand, Beatle historian Bruce Spizer calls "We're All Water" a "poorly played rock song," complaining primarily about Ono's "wailing" during the instrumental breaks.

== Other appearances ==
Ono and Lennon performed "We're All Water" backed by Elephant's Memory for an episode of The Dick Cavett Show in May 1972. The couple also performed "Woman Is the Nigger of the World" on this episode, which was the only television appearance for either song. The Ono-Lennons also performed "We're All Water" at both One to One benefit concerts on 30 August 1972, at Madison Square Garden in New York. But the song was excluded from both the album and the video of the concert, Live in New York City. Bootlegs exist for the evening performance, but all tapes of the afternoon performances appear to be incomplete.

"We're All Water" was included in the score to Ono's musical play New York Rock.

== Personnel ==
The personnel on the Some Time in New York City recording were:

- Yoko Ono – vocals
- John Lennon – guitar
- Wayne 'Tex' Gabriel – guitar
- Stan Bronstein – saxophone
- Gary Van Scyoc – bass
- Adam Ippolito – piano, organ
- Richard Frank Jr. – drums, percussion
- Jim Keltner – drums
