= The Luck of the Irish (song) =

Song by John Lennon and Yoko Ono as Plastic Ono Band

from the album Some Time in New York City
- Released: 12 June 1972 (US); 15 September 1972 (UK)
- Recorded: 1972
- Genre: Folk rock
- Length: 2:56
- Label: Apple/EMI
- Songwriter: John Lennon
- Producers: John Lennon; Yoko Ono; Phil Spector

Some Time in New York City track listing
- 16 tracks Side one: 1. "Woman Is the Nigger of the World"; 2. "Sisters, O Sisters"; 3. "Attica State"; 4. "Born in a Prison"; 5. "New York City"; Side two: 6. "Sunday Bloody Sunday"; 7. "The Luck of the Irish"; 8. "John Sinclair"; 9. "Angela"; 10. "We're All Water"; Side three: 11. "Cold Turkey"; 12. "Don't Worry Kyoko"; Side four: 13. "Well (Baby Please Don't Go)"; 14. "Jamrag"; 15. "Scumbag"; 16. "Au"

"The Luck of the Irish" is a song written by John Lennon and Yoko Ono that was first released on the couple's 1972 Plastic Ono Band album with Elephant's Memory, Some Time in New York City. It was written in late 1971 and was performed by Lennon and Ono live at several protest rallies and television appearances before being released on the album. It had been slated to be the first single from Some Time in New York City backed by "Attica State" but the release was shelved in favour of "Woman Is the Nigger of the World". A live acoustic performance was released on several John Lennon compilation albums.

== Music and lyrics ==
"The Luck of the Irish" uses a folk-like melody performed in waltz time . At the time, Lennon and Ono believed that the simplicity of a folk melody would encourage audience participation and help engage the audience in their political causes. Music critic Johnny Rogan describes it as having a "waltztime arrangement". A flute played by Stan Bronstein provides a countermelody to the vocal part. Rogan regards the flute part as evidence that the song began as a folk song and was subsequently converted to a pop song. Ben Urish and Ken Bielen describe the music as having a "pleasant lilting rhythm."

The song's lyrics castigate the history of British rule in Ireland, describing how a "land full of beauty and wonder" was "raped by the British brigands". The title of the song was intended to be ironic, as Lennon sings that the luck of the Irish has been historically non-existent, and "if you had the luck of the Irish" that "you'd wish you was [sic] English instead." The pleasant melody was also intended to provide an ironic contrast to the lyrics, in which Lennon describes how "a thousand years of torture and hunger" drove the Irish people "away from their land". Musicologist Walter Everett highlights a line claiming that the English "kill with God on their side" as being a reference to Bob Dylan, whose 1963 protest song "With God on Our Side" described the United States entering into all their conflicts "with God on our side." Rogan takes the Dylan reference further, stating that the lines "they kill with God on their side/Blame it all on the kids and the IRA/As the bastards commit genocide" combine the sentiments of "With God on Our Side" with those of Dylan's earlier song "Masters of War".

In the bridge sections Ono sings contrasting lyrics incorporating stereotypical elements of Irish culture such as leprechauns, shamrocks and the Blarney Stone while describing the pastoral happiness the Lennons imagine Ireland could enjoy without British interference. Rogan regards these lyrics as providing a "naive, sentimentalized view of Éire", which offset Lennon's harsh viewpoint, although he regards the leprechaun and Blarney Stone references as "asinine".

== Background ==
"The Luck of the Irish" is one of two songs on Some Time in New York City dealing with the ongoing ethno-nationalist conflict in Northern Ireland at the time. While the other Irish-themed song, "Sunday Bloody Sunday," was written specifically in response to the Bloody Sunday massacre on 30 January 1972, "The Luck of the Irish" had been written in November 1971, inspired by a protest march that Lennon had participated in the previous August. Lennon had intended that the royalties from the song would be donated to NORAID. Bootleg tapes exist of Lennon playing an early version of the song in the fall of 1971. On this early version the melody is not yet fully developed and Lennon sings the refrains that are sung by Yoko Ono on later versions. On 12 November 1971 John Reilly filmed the couple rehearsing and performing the song at their home on 105 Bank Street in the Greenwich Village section of New York City. Soundtracks from the released short film as well as from unused rehearsal footage have also been bootlegged.

The Lennons had intended "The Luck of the Irish" to be the first single from Some Time in New York City in late February or early March 1972, backed by "Attica State," and it even received a catalogue number of Apple 1846 before being pulled and replaced by "Woman Is the Nigger of the World." According to Lennon biographer Jon Wiener, the single was intended to have a cover photo depicting Lennon singing the song at a rally at the British Overseas Airways Corporation offices in New York on 5 February 1972. According to Wiener the single did go out to several disc jockeys and the official release was pulled due to their negative response.

Yoko Ono attested to John's love for Ireland in an interview in 2012. "My husband was 100% Irish. That's what he used to say. Ireland was sort of like an auntie or a mother that he wanted to show me". “When he was born, his mother was English and his father was Irish and he didn't have too much opportunity to see his father, so he had this yearning for being Irish. In a way it was sad because he was always talking about that".

== Reception ==
Music journalist Paul Du Noyer claimed that combining Lennon's "simplistic polemic" with Ono's "tourist brochure cliches" creates "more embarrassment than enlightenment." Beatle biographer John Blaney criticised the "plodding metre, rose–tinted lyric and uninspired vocal," concluding that the song is "impotent" and an "unwelcome aberration" for Lennon. Beatle biographer Chris Ingham mocks the use of leprechauns in the song's "condescending poetry" and describes the song as "sentimental" and "political propaganda." Lennon biographer Philip Norman found the sentiments expressed by "The Luck of the Irish" to be even more extreme than those of "Sunday Bloody Sunday" and compared the song's sarcasm to Lennon's earlier protest song "Working Class Hero" but felt that the song was let down by the "lyrically clichéd folk protest form." Beatle biographers Chip Madinger and Mark Easter described "The Luck of the Irish" as "a pleasant little song" but criticised Ono's singing, which they described as "bleating" and they also regarded some of the lyrics as "truly awful." Journalist Robin Denselow criticised the lyrics of both of Lennon's Irish-themed songs on Some Time in New York City in 1989, singling out the line that "If you had the luck of the Irish...you'd wish you was English instead" as being "downright insulting." Wiener described the song as a "failure."

On the other hand, Urish and Bielen find the dark humour to be "clever" and feel that song succeeds as "sociopolitical polemic." Music critic Tim Riley described "The Luck of the Irish" as "gorgeous and underrated." Rogan takes an intermediate view calling the song "impressive, if flawed," praising the cleverness of contrasting the naive sentiments in the bridge with the harsh political lyrics in the verses, but criticising the lyrics. Beatle historian Bruce Spizer also criticised the lyrics while praising the melody. Uncut writer John Lewis also provides a mixed assessment, praising Lennon's "bitter, sardonic tone" and the wit of his ironic use of the phrase "luck of the Irish" but saying that this is undermined by the "risible litany" of Irish stereotypes in the bridge. Creem critic Dave Marsh similarly concluded that "The Luck of the Irish" has a beautiful melody and is "convincing musically," but felt that it was unconvincing lyrically and that "it's about the Irish in the way 'Old Black Joe' is about blacks, fostering stereotypes that are both false and (inadvertently but nonetheless) racist." Music journalist Rob Sheffield stated that "Luck of the Irish" is "a terrible song I've loved since Shonen Knife covered it."

According to Beatle biographers Roy Carr and Tony Tyler, Lennon's prestige in England nosedived as a result of the song's accusations of genocide.

Far Out critic Tim Coffman rated it as Lennon's 6th greatest deep cut, saying "Using a gentle approach to the subject matter, Lennon leaves many of the gory details up to the listener’s imagination, letting the listener fill in the gaps by keeping everything sparse. For as much as Lennon idolised Dylan, this may be one of the few times his songwriting approach matched his folk-rock idol."

== Live performances ==
Lennon and Ono first performed "The Luck of the Irish" live at a freedom rally protesting the imprisonment of John Sinclair on 10 December 1971 at Crisler Arena in at the University of Michigan in Ann Arbor. "The Luck of the Irish" was the second of four songs the couple sang at the rally, along with "Attica State," "Sisters, O Sisters" and "John Sinclair." Lennon played acoustic guitar and Ono played percussion, and the couple was also accompanied by David Peel on washtub bass, Jerry Rubin on percussion and a number of other New York City musicians. This version was included on the compilation albums John Lennon Anthology and Acoustic.

About a week later, on 16 December 1971, Lennon and Ono taped a short portion of the song for their appearance on The David Frost Show, which aired on 13 January 1972. The performance was apparently in response to several audience members who objected to the sympathy expressed to the participants in the Attica Prison riot in the preceding song "Attica State," in an attempt by Lennon and Ono to demonstrate that their songs expressed sympathy for everyone.

The Lennons also performed "The Luck of the Irish" in the last show of their week co-hosting the Mike Douglas Show in a performance taped on 28 January 1972 and broadcast on 18 February 1972. In this performance Lennon and Ono accompanied themselves on acoustic guitar and percussion, respectively. In this performance Lennon altered the lyric slightly to refer to the British as "bummers" rather than "bastards" in order to accommodate broadcast requirements, but he did sing the word "goddamn" which was edited out by broadcast censors. Lennon made another change to the lyrics for this performance, singing that the British blame "the kids, the churches and the IRA" for the problems in Northern Ireland whereas in the official release they only blame "the kids and the IRA." Before the performance Lennon announced that proceeds from the song would be donated to civil rights defence in Northern Ireland.

Lennon later performed "The Luck of the Irish" at a protest of the Bloody Sunday massacre on 5 February 1972 at the British Overseas Airways Corporation offices in New York. At this performance he again pledged to donate his revenue from the song towards the civil rights movement in Northern Ireland.

== Personnel ==
The personnel on the Some Time in New York City recording were:

- John Lennon – vocals, guitar
- Yoko Ono – vocals
- Wayne 'Tex' Gabriel – guitar
- Stan Bronstein – flute
- Gary Van Scyoc – bass
- Adam Ippolito – piano, organ
- Richard Frank Jr. – drums, percussion
- Jim Keltner – drums
