= Live in New York City (John Lennon album) =

Live album by John Lennon
- Released: 10 February 1986
- Recorded: 30 August 1972
- Venues: Madison Square Garden, New York City
- Genres: Rock, blues rock, hard rock, rock and roll
- Length: 42:30
- Labels: Parlophone/EMI; Capitol (North America)
- Producer: Yoko Ono

John Lennon chronology
Milk and Honey (1984)	Live in New York City (1986)	Menlove Ave. (1986)

Professional ratings
Review scores
Source	Rating
AllMusic	2.5/5 stars
MusicHound	2.5/5 stars
Rolling Stone	(favourable)
The Rolling Stone Album Guide	3/5 stars

Live in New York City is a posthumous live album by English rock musician John Lennon with the Plastic Ono Elephant's Memory Band. It was prepared under the supervision of his widow, Yoko Ono, and released in 1986 as his third official live album.

Live in New York City reached No. 55 in the UK, and No. 41 in the US, eventually attaining a gold certification by RIAA.

== Performances ==
Recorded on 30 August 1972 at Madison Square Garden in New York City, Lennon performed two shows, one in the afternoon and one in the evening, a benefit concert for the Willowbrook State School for Retarded Children in New York, at friend Geraldo Rivera's request. Rivera introduces Lennon and Ono at the beginning of the album, and he is referenced in Lennon's impromptu revised lyrics in the opening song, "New York City".

The benefit concerts, billed as One to One, also featured other performers in addition to Lennon, including Stevie Wonder, Roberta Flack, Melanie Safka and Sha Na Na, although their performances are not included on this album, nor on the simultaneous video release.

Live in New York City captures Lennon's last full-length concert performance, coming right after the release (in June 1972 in the US) of Some Time in New York City. Backing Lennon and Ono were Elephant's Memory, who had served as Lennon and Ono's backing band on Some Time in New York City. Although the material Lennon performed was largely drawn from his three most recent albums of the period (John Lennon/Plastic Ono Band, Imagine and Some Time in New York City), he also included in the set list his solo hit "Instant Karma!", his Beatles hit "Come Together" and paid tribute to Elvis Presley with "Hound Dog" before leading the audience in a singalong of "Give Peace a Chance". "Come Together", originally in the key of D major, was performed in E major.

== Release and reception ==
On the CD and vinyl editions, the first eight of the eleven songs were from the afternoon performance. The VHS and LaserDisc video versions contained fourteen songs, ten of which were from the afternoon show. Both editions included between-song dialogue taken from both shows.

Upon its early 1986 release, Ono was criticised by former members of Elephant's Memory for using mostly the afternoon performance which they regarded as weaker than the evening show. They also took issue with the simultaneous video release of the concert, which was alleged to have been edited to show Ono as prominently as Lennon.

However, on the album release, Ono's vocal performances on such numbers as "Hound Dog" had been mixed out completely. Additionally, all of her solo performances, which included "Sisters, O Sisters", "Born in a Prison", "We're All Water", "Don't Worry Kyoko (Mummy's Only Looking for Her Hand in the Snow)", "Move on Fast" and "Open Your Box", were deleted from the audio edition of the concert, to create a pure Lennon album.

The video release retained the Lennon complete set-list and also included Ono's "Sisters, O Sisters" and "Born in a Prison".

Portions of the evening performance later saw release on the John Lennon Anthology.

On October 10, 2025, both One to One shows were released as a live album and as part of the box set called Power to the People as part of the "Ultimate Mix" campaign. The shows were also made available as a best of "hybrid" show, containing highlights from both performances. However, the release excluded two songs that were performed at both shows: "Woman is the Nigger of the World", which was controversially omitted from all of the discs of the Power to the People (The Ultimate Collection) box set, and "Sisters, O Sisters".

== Historical significance ==
The concerts documented on Live in New York City were Lennon's only rehearsed and full-length live performances in his solo career, and his only formal, full-fledged live concerts since the Beatles retired from the road in 1966. Lennon never mounted a tour during his post-Beatles career. The concerts also marked the last time he performed live with Ono or with Elephant's Memory.

In a contemporary review, Cash Box said that "This performance, five years before the debut of The Sex Pistols, presaged, among other modern trends, the whole punk movement." and that "Yoko Ono, the album’s producer, and Capitol are to be commended for bringing these important recordings to the public."

== Track listing ==
All tracks are written by John Lennon, except where noted.

Side one
No.	Title	Writer(s)	Length
1.	"New York City"		2:56
2.	"It's So Hard"		3:18
3.	"Woman Is the Nigger of the World"	Lennon, Yoko Ono	5:30
4.	"Well Well Well"		3:51
5.	"Instant Karma!"		3:40

Side two
No.	Title	Writer(s)	Length
6.	"Mother"		5:00
7.	"Come Together"	Lennon–McCartney	4:21
8.	"Imagine"	Lennon/Yoko Ono (Note: The original single credited Lennon as the sole songwriter. In 2017, the National Music Publishers Association revised the credit to include Ono.)	3:17
9.	"Cold Turkey"		5:29
10.	"Hound Dog"	Jerry Leiber and Mike Stoller	3:09
11.	"Give Peace a Chance"		1:00
Total length:			42:30

== Personnel ==
- John Lennon – vocals, rhythm guitar, piano, Wurlitzer 200a electric piano
- Yoko Ono – vocals, piano, Wurlitzer 200a electric piano, percussion
- Jim Keltner – drums
- Elephant's Memory:

- Wayne 'Tex' Gabriel – lead guitar
- Gary Van Scyoc – bass guitar
- John Ward – bass guitar
- Stan Bronstein – saxophone
- Adam Ippolito – piano
- Richard Frank Jr. – drums

== Charts ==
Chart performance for Live in New York City
Chart (1986)	Peak position
Australian Albums (Kent Music Report)	66
Canada Top Albums/CDs (RPM)	33
Dutch Albums (Album Top 100)	71
German Albums (Offizielle Top 100)	65
Swedish Albums (Sverigetopplistan)	12
UK Albums (Official Charts)	55
US Billboard 200	41

== Certifications ==
Certifications for Live in New York City
Region	Certification	Certified units/sales
United States (RIAA)	Gold	500,000^{^}
^{^} Shipments figures based on certification alone.

== See also ==
- One to One: John & Yoko, a 2024 documentary film
