= Sisters, O Sisters =

Single by Yoko Ono

from the album Some Time in New York City
- A-side: "Woman Is the Nigger of the World" (John Lennon)
- Released: 24 April 1972 (US)
- Recorded: February 1972
- Studio: Record Plant East, New York City
- Genre: Rock
- Length: 3:48
- Label: Apple
- Songwriter: Yoko Ono
- Producers: John Lennon, Yoko Ono, Phil Spector

John Lennon singles chronology
"Happy Xmas (War Is Over)" (1971)	"Sisters, O Sisters" (1972)	"Mind Games" (1973)

Some Time in New York City track listing
- 16 tracks Side one: 1. "Woman Is the Nigger of the World"; 2. "Sisters, O Sisters"; 3. "Attica State"; 4. "Born in a Prison"; 5. "New York City"; Side two: 6. "Sunday Bloody Sunday"; 7. "The Luck of the Irish"; 8. "John Sinclair"; 9. "Angela"; 10. "We're All Water"; Side three: 11. "Cold Turkey"; 12. "Don't Worry Kyoko"; Side four: 13. "Well (Baby Please Don't Go)"; 14. "Jamrag"; 15. "Scumbag"; 16. "Au"

"Sisters, O Sisters", also known as "Sisters O Sisters", is a song written by Yoko Ono that first appeared on John Lennon's and Yoko Ono's 1972 Plastic Ono Band album Some Time in New York City, backed by Elephant's Memory. It was also released as the b-side to the couple's "Woman Is the Nigger of the World" single. It has been covered by a number of artists, including Le Tigre and Tater Totz.

== Lyrics and music ==
Authors Ken Bielen and Ben Urish describe "Sisters, O Sisters" as a "cheerful feminist anthem". John Blaney calls it "Ono's open letter to her oppressed sisters". Before the song begins on the album there is spoken dialogue in which Ono refers to the "male chauvinist pig engineer" and Lennon responds "right on, sister". The song's lyrics encourage women to use their power to improve the world. Music critic Johnny Rogan classifies the song as a "rallying cry".

"Sisters, O Sisters" was intended as a reggae song, but, according to Lennon, Elephant's Memory were all from New York, and they did not understand reggae. Lennon claimed that he tried to explain reggae to them by teaching them Desmond Dekker's "The Israelites". He stated that "If you listen to [Sisters, O Sisters], you'll hear me trying to get them to reggae". Blaney describes the result as "a conventional rock song with a reggae twist".

"Sisters, O Sisters" was produced by Phil Spector along with Ono and Lennon. Beatles expert Bruce Spizer describes the sound of the song's backing track as "a throwback to [Spector's] wall of sound girl group records of the 60s".

== Reception ==
AllMusic critic Bruce Eder praises the song for its "peculiar form of reggae-pop". Music critic Johnny Rogan calls the melody "trite" and Ono's lead vocal "uncertain", but claims that it is clear that Lennon is enjoying himself "playing rock 'n' roll guitar". Rogan compares Ono's vocal performance to an "out of tune version of an early Sixties girl group vocalist". Bielen and Urish praise Elephant's Memory's playing as "spry", noting particularly the way the middle eight builds momentum. Rogan describes their playing as "jaunty".

Blaney notes that the song marks a change in the way Ono approached her work. Unlike Ono's earlier political songs, in which she believed the world could be changed by "the power of positive projection", in "Sisters, O Sisters" she encourages the listener to intervene directly. Blaney believes that the song's positive message would have been more powerful had she used metaphor to make its case, claiming that as it stands it "had all the power of second-hand political cant". Blaney also infers Lennon's influence on her writing in that it represents a move away from avant-garde songs she had been writing in the past to more conventional rock songs that she included on Some Time in New York City and her follow-up album Approximately Infinite Universe.

== Other versions ==
A home recording of "Sisters, O Sisters" was made by the couple as early as Fall 1971. The couple performed the song, along with three other songs that would appear on Some Time in New York City – "Attica State", "The Luck of the Irish" and "John Sinclair" – at a rally in Ann Arbor, Michigan supporting freeing John Sinclair from prison on December 10, 1971. At the time, they claimed that it had been "written the day before yesterday". It also received several television performances in early 1972. The couple performed it on The David Frost Show, along with the other songs performed at the John Sinclair rally, in a broadcast recorded on December 16, 1971, and broadcast on January 13, 1972. It was then performed on the Mike Douglas Show in a performance that was recorded on January 20, 1972, and broadcast on February 16, 1972. This was the same episode in which Lennon and Ono later joined Chuck Berry in performances of "Memphis, Tennessee" and "Johnny B. Goode". Lennon played acoustic guitar on this performance.

Ono and Lennon also performed "Sisters, O Sisters" live at both "One to One" benefit concerts at Madison Square Garden on August 30, 1972. The evening performance was issued on the video Live in New York City. Bielen and Urish praise Lennon's rhythm guitar work on this performance.

== Cover versions ==
Le Tigre covered "Sisters, O Sisters" on the 2007 collaboration album Yes, I'm a Witch, performing with Ono's vocals. AllMusic critic Thom Jurek describes this version as "bass-throbbing bomb electronic funk with horn loops and backing choruses". James Hunter of Spin describes their version as "giddily disco-fied".

Tater Totz covered "Sisters, O Sisters" on their 1980 album Mono Stereo. A live performance by Tater Totz from July 16, 1989, in San Francisco was released on their 1993 album Tater Comes Alive.

The Sultans of Ping FC covered "Sisters, O Sisters" on their 1994 album Teenage Drug. The track is listed as just "Sisters".

== Personnel ==
Personnel on the single and Some Time in New York City recording are:

- Yoko Ono – vocals
- John Lennon – guitar
- Wayne 'Tex' Gabriel – guitar
- Stan Bronstein – saxophone
- Gary Van Scyoc – bass guitar
- Adam Ippolito – piano, organ
- Richard Frank Jr. – drums, percussion
- Jim Keltner – drums
