= Don't Worry Kyoko (Mummy's Only Looking for Her Hand in the Snow) =

Single by Yoko Ono and Plastic Ono Band

from the album Fly
- A-side: "Cold Turkey"
- Released: 20 October 1969 (US); 24 October 1969 (UK)
- Recorded: 3 October 1969
- Studio: Studio A, Lansdowne, London, England
- Genre: Experimental rock
- Length: 4:52
- Label: Apple
- Songwriter: Yoko Ono
- Producers: John Lennon; Yoko Ono

Yoko Ono and Plastic Ono Band singles chronology
"Give Peace a Chance"/"Remember Love" (1969)	"Don't Worry Kyoko (Mummy's Only Looking for Her Hand in the Snow)" (1969)	"Instant Karma!"/"Who Has Seen the Wind" (1970)

Some Time in New York City track listing
- 16 tracks Side one: 1. "Woman Is the Nigger of the World"; 2. "Sisters, O Sisters"; 3. "Attica State"; 4. "Born in a Prison"; 5. "New York City"; Side two: 6. "Sunday Bloody Sunday"; 7. "The Luck of the Irish"; 8. "John Sinclair"; 9. "Angela"; 10. "We're All Water"; Side three: 11. "Cold Turkey"; 12. "Don't Worry Kyoko"; Side four: 13. "Well (Baby Please Don't Go)"; 14. "Jamrag"; 15. "Scumbag"; 16. "Au"

"Don't Worry Kyoko (Mummy's Only Looking for Her Hand in the Snow)" is a song by Yoko Ono that was originally released by the Plastic Ono Band in October 1969 as the B-side of the "Cold Turkey" single, and was later released on Ono's 1971 album Fly. Several live versions have been released, including on Plastic Ono Band's Live Peace in Toronto 1969 and the John & Yoko/Plastic Ono Band With Elephant's Memory album Some Time in New York City in 1972. An early version was titled "Mum's Only Looking for Her Hand in the Snow". It has been covered by several other artists.

In 2023, The Guardian named it as Ono's seventh-best song of all time.

== Lyrics and music ==
"Don't Worry Kyoko (Mummy's Only Looking for Her Hand in the Snow)" was inspired by Lennon and Ono's custody fight with Ono's ex-husband Anthony Cox over Cox and Ono's daughter Kyoko, representing Ono's attempt to communicate with her daughter. Ono and Kyoko were finally reunited in the 1990s when Kyoko was in her thirties.

Though "Don't Worry Kyoko (Mummy's Only Looking for Her Hand in the Snow)" is credited as written solely by Ono, the music is derived from the unreleased Lennon-McCartney composition "Watching Rainbows". The lyrics consist primarily of Ono wailing the phrase "Don't worry." On the live version included on Live Peace in Toronto 1969, the phrase "mummy's only looking for her hand in the snow" is also included. The song is driven primarily by a blues-based guitar riff played by Lennon and Eric Clapton. The riff is strikingly similar to the intro of the Everly Brothers' 1957 hit "Wake Up Little Susie". John Blaney describes the riff as "hypnotic." Authors Ben Urish and Ken Belen write that Lennon and Clapton alternate between a "lilting semi-slide" groove and playing "sniping bites." The other musicians on the studio version are Klaus Voormann on bass guitar and Ringo Starr on drums. According to Urish and Belen, Starr's drumming variations ensure that the tension keeps mounting. John Lennon claimed that the song was "one of the fuckin' best rock 'n' roll records ever made."

AllMusic critic Ned Raggett describes Ono's vocal as a "screwy blues yowl," claiming that it suggests "something off Led Zeppelin III gone utterly berserk." The New York Times critic Allan Kozinn compares Ono's vocal to "a wailing, overdriven electric guitar," claiming its virtuosity compares with the actual electric guitar playing of Lennon and Clapton. Rolling Stone contributor John Lewis describes it as a "mournful caterwaul of despair."

The earliest recorded version of the song, titled "Mum's Only Looking for Her Hand in the Snow" was sung by Ono at Queen Charlotte's Hospital while she was being observed during her pregnancy with Lennon's child, a pregnancy that ended in a miscarriage. Lennon provides the sole accompaniment on acoustic guitar. This version was originally released by Aspen magazine and was later included as a bonus track on the CD reissue of the couple's Wedding Album. The studio version released as a single and on Fly was recorded on October 3, 1969, at Lansdowne Studios in London. The single has the words "PLAY LOUD" written on the label, as does "Cold Turkey" on the other side.

== Live versions ==
The version of "Don't Worry Kyoko (Mummy's Only Looking for Her Hand in the Snow)" included on Live Peace in Toronto 1969 was recorded at Varsity Stadium in Toronto, Canada on September 13, 1969. The Plastic Ono Band for that performance was assembled on short notice and included Ono, Lennon, Clapton, Voormann and Alan White on drums. After Lennon played some of his recent songs and rock 'n' roll classics, Ono sang a two-song set consisting of "Don't Worry Kyoko (Mummy's Only Looking for Her Hand in the Snow)" followed by "John John (Let's Hope for Peace)." Audience reaction to her set was muted, and some booing was reported, more directed at "John John" than "Don't Worry Kyoko." John Blaney explains that the audience "had come to listen to good ol' rock 'n' roll, not a Japanese woman screaming at the top of her voice," but "one could at least get into the groove of 'Don't Worry Kyoko.'" Chip Madinger and Mark Easter claim that despite the audience's cold reception, the band "did an admirable job" backing Ono on the song. Ken Bielen and Ben Urish claim that the audience may have been startled by "Ono's full-throttle vocals and Lennon and Clapton's hard core guitar sounds".

The version on Some Time in New York City was recorded at the Lyceum Ballroom in London on December 15, 1969, at the "Peace for Christmas" concert for UNICEF. In addition to the musicians who performed in Toronto, Billy Preston played keyboards, George Harrison played guitar, Keith Moon joined in on drums towards the end, and members of Delaney & Bonnie & Friends also performed. This version reportedly lasted 40 minutes, as the musicians became "locked in the hypnotic riff," and was edited down to 15 minutes for the album release. Drummer Alan White recalls finally bringing the song to its conclusion by speeding up to the point where the other musicians couldn't keep up, and then slowing the tempo down, allowing the song to end. Lennon claimed that the musicians on this version were "inspired out of their skulls" and that it was "the most fantastic music [he'd] ever heard."

Bielen and Urish describe this performance as "vibrant", enhanced by the call and response between Ono's vocal and the horn section, and claim that the finale was so "hyped-up" that even Ono had trouble keeping up. Lennon biographer Geoffery Giuliano and Moon biographer Tony Fletcher claim that half the audience walked out during the performance.

The Ono-Lennons played the song, backed by Jim Keltner on drums and Elephant's Memory, at the matinee performance of the One to One benefit concerts at Madison Square Garden in New York City on August 30, 1972. These concerts were released as the Live in New York City album and video, but "Don't Worry Kyoko" was not performed for the evening concert and was not included on either the album or video versions of Live in New York City.

In September 2005, Ono performed the song as an encore to her performance at ArthurFest. Ono's and Lennon's son Sean Lennon led the band for that performance. Reviewing that performance, Los Angeles Times critic Steve Hochman claimed that "the bleats and squalls for which Ono became famous/infamous were now expressions of a wide range of emotions as her band, led by her son Sean Lennon, pounded out primal art-blues."

== Reception ==
Music critic Johnny Rogan considers "Don't Worry Kyoko (Mummy's Only Looking for Her Hand in the Snow)" to be "arguably Yoko Ono's finest recorded moment."

Authors Ken Bielen and Ben Urish praise the studio version as "the standout inclusion on Fly," calling it "an amazing achievement," particularly the guitar work of Lennon and Clapton, Starr's "slowly varying drum work" and Ono's vocal, which they call "one of her most effective." The New York Times' Kozinn calls the song a "searing rocker." The Los Angeles Times' Hochman describes the song as "a raw, anguished cry from the soul." Author Bruce Pollock describes it as having "frenzied glory."

The live version included on Some Time in New York City was called by Bielen and Urish "a stunning masterwork." Lewis finds this version to be "astonishing," stating that Ono "sounds remarkable: screaming, yelping, howling and ululating over a blues-funk jam".

== Personnel ==
- Yoko Ono – vocals
- John Lennon – electric guitar
- Eric Clapton – electric guitar
- Klaus Voormann – bass guitar
- Ringo Starr – drums

== Cover versions ==
"Don't Worry Kyoko (Mummy's Only Looking for Her Hand in the Snow)" has been recorded by other artists. The B-52's recorded it on their Whammy! LP, but it was removed and replaced with a new recording of "There's a Moon in the Sky" on the UK pressing. All CD reissues have used the UK version, without formal explanation. Tater Totz released a 17-minute live version, recorded in San Francisco in 1989, on their 1993 album, Tater Comes Alive. A 27-minute version, recorded live in Los Angeles in 1988, was included as a bonus track on the CD version of the album. They also released it on their 1988 album, Alien Sleestacks from Brazil. Alan Decotes covered the song on his 2007 album Don't Worry Rock N' Roll. Donny Who Loved Bowling covered it on the 2005 album Tree Fort. Yo La Tengo covered it live on the radio in New Jersey and released it in 2006 on their album, Yo La Tengo Is Murdering the Classics, a compilation of live impromptu cover-song performances on the New Jersey freeform radio station WFMU. In the late 1970s, a version of the song was recorded by John Flansburgh and John Linnell, two high school friends that would later form the alt rock duo They Might Be Giants in Flansburgh's basement. It has often been cited by the band as one of their earliest recordings, although they have never released it.
