= The Tuneful Trolley =

The Tuneful Trolley was an American psych-pop sextet from the late 1960s. Originally a high school band called "The Mark of Quality" from Suffolk County, Long Island, they were discovered and renamed by Sandy Yaguda of Jay and the Americans. Yaguda helped the band sign with Capitol Records and produced their first and only album, Island in the Sky.

== Island in the Sky ==
Their 1968 album has been called sunshine pop and psychedelic pop. The first eleven tracks were released in their original LP in vinyl. The track list below reflects Cherry Red Records's Now Sounds division's re-release of the album in 2008 with mono mixes of four singles released after the record.

No.	Title		Length
1	The Tuneful Trolley Theme	Written by A. Bordonaro, J. DeSane, and S. Ciccarello	2:32
2	Hello Love	Lead vocals by Joey DeSane. Written by Ritchie Adams	2:51
3	Sunny Days	Written by K. Laguna and P. Naumann	1:58
4	Georgianna Peach Pie	Written by A. Bordonaro and J. DeSane	2:01
5	Lady (With the Tangerine Blouse)	Written by J. DeSane and S. Ciccarello	2:39
6	M.A.C.K. (Mothers Authoritative Collection Of Knowledge)	Lead vocals by A. Bordonaro. Written by A. Bordonaro and J. DeSane	1:46
7	Lovely Day	Written by A. Bordonaro, J. DeSane, and S. Ciccarello	1:55
8	Written Charter	Written by A. Bordonaro, J. DeSane, and S. Ciccarello	2:44
9	I Got You Around	Lead vocals by B. Parks. Written by K. Laguna and P. Naumann	2:36
10	My Apple Pie	Written by A. Bordonaro	2:31
11	Uncle Joe's Armada	Written by A. Bordonaro and J. Riolo	2:38
12	Hello Love	Written by Ritchie Adams	2:52
13	Sunny Days		1:59
14	My Apple Pie		2:29
15	Written Charter		2:30

=== Personnel ===
- Bass, Backing Vocals – B. Parks
- Directed By [Music Director] – Jerry Vance
- Drums, Backing Vocals – J. Riolo
- Engineer – Stefan Bright
- Horns – "Elephant Memory" is Myron Elephant, Stanley Elephant*
- Lead Guitar, Backing Vocals – S. Ciccarello
- Lead Vocals, Keyboards - J. DeSane
- Liner Notes – Jay and The Americans
- Keyboards, Backing Vocals – P. Conocenti
- Producer – Sandy Yaguda
- Rhythm Guitar, Backing Vocals – A. Bordonaro

== Members ==
- Anthony (Tony) Bordonaro (guitar, vocals)
- Brian Parks (bass, vocals)
- Jack Riolo (drums, vocals)
- Joey DeSane (Keyboard, Lead vocals)
- Paul Conocenti (organ, vocals)
- Santo Ciccarello (guitar, vocals)

== Discography ==
- Island in the Sky (1968)
- Sunny Days / My Apple Pie (1968)
- Hello Love / Written Charter (1968)
