= Some Time in New York City =

1972 studio album by Plastic Ono Band

Studio album and live album by John & Yoko/Plastic Ono Band with Elephant's Memory and the Invisible Strings
- Released: 12 June 1972
- Recorded: Studio: December 1971 – 20 March 1972; Live: 15 December 1969, 6 June 1971
- Venues: 15 December 1969, Lyceum Ballroom, London; 6 June 1971, Fillmore East, New York City
- Genre: Rock
- Length: 90:33
- Label: Apple
- Producers: John Lennon, Yoko Ono, Phil Spector

John Lennon chronology
Imagine (1971)	Some Time in New York City (1972)	Mind Games (1973)

Yoko Ono chronology
Fly (1971)	Some Time in New York City (1972)	Approximately Infinite Universe (1973)

Singles from Some Time in New York City
- 1. "Woman Is the Nigger of the World" Released: 24 April 1972

Some Time in New York City (Note: The title is rendered Sometime in New York City on the record label, inner jacket, and original compact disc.) is the fourth collaborative studio album, and second live album by John Lennon and Yoko Ono as Plastic Ono Band. A double album, it includes backing by the American rock band Elephant's Memory. Released in June 1972 in the US and in September 1972 in the UK on Apple Records, it is Lennon's sixth album to be released under his own name, and his fourth collaboration with Ono. Like Lennon's previous solo albums, it was co-produced by Lennon, Ono and Phil Spector. The album's agitprop lyrics are politically charged compared to its predecessors, addressing political and social issues and topics such as sexism, incarceration, colonialism, and racism.

Recording for the album's studio portion took place between December 1971 and March 1972 while the live portion, released as Live Jam, was recorded on 15 December 1969 at the Lyceum Ballroom in London for a UNICEF charity concert and on 6 June 1971 at Fillmore East in New York City. Musicians who contributed to the 1969 performance include Eric Clapton, George Harrison, Nicky Hopkins, Keith Moon and Klaus Voormann, while the 1971 performance features Frank Zappa and his band the Mothers of Invention.

Preceded by the single "Woman Is the Nigger of the World", which caused controversy due to its title, Some Time in New York City received scathing reviews on release and performed poorly commercially. Reviewers were especially critical of its politically charged content. Zappa was critical of Lennon and Ono's handling of the recordings of the Mothers performance, eventually releasing his own version of the performance on Playground Psychotics (1992). Some Time in New York City was reissued on compact disc in 2005 as a single album, removing several of the Live Jam songs while adding other non-album singles, and again on CD in 2010 in its original double album format.

== Background ==
John Lennon and Yoko Ono moved to New York City in September 1971 and continued their involvement in political, peace and social justice causes of the counterculture era. When they settled in Greenwich Village, in October, they were quickly contacted by activists Jerry Rubin and Abbie Hoffman who persuaded them to appear at an upcoming rally for left-wing writer John Sinclair, who had been jailed for possession of two marijuana joints. The Lennons also spoke out on the Attica Prison riots, jailing of Angela Davis and oppression of women. On 12 November, Lennon and Ono taped numerous demos of "The Luck of the Irish", which were videotaped by director John Reilly for a 17-minute documentary short titled Luck of the Irish – A Videotape by John Reilly. On 9 December, Lennon and Ono flew to Ann Arbor, Michigan, for the John Sinclair rally, which was due to start the next day. Soon after their arrival, Lennon recorded "Chords of Fame" with Phil Ochs. At the rally itself, Lennon and Ono played four songs that would end up on Some Time in New York City: "Attica State", "The Luck of the Irish", "Sisters O Sisters" and "John Sinclair". The performance was filmed, and included in the short film Ten for Two which was shown locally in Ann Arbor sometime in December. (Note: The film was not widely released until 1 April 1989.)

Lennon and Ono, along with David Peel, performed Peel's "The Ballad of New York" on The David Frost Show, with Lennon playing tea-chest bass. The trio, now joined by The Lower East Side Band, played the same set of songs that Lennon and Ono had played at the John Sinclair rally, though the version of "The Luck of the Irish" was shorter. This episode was recorded on 16 December 1971 and broadcast on 13 January 1972. The next day, Lennon and Ono performed at a benefit concert for families of victims of the Attica Prison riot at the Apollo Theater, playing acoustic versions of "Imagine", "Attica State", and "Sisters, O Sisters".

== Recording ==
The original double album contained the live album Live Jam, featuring the Plastic Ono Supergroup's 15 December 1969 live performances of "Cold Turkey" and "Don't Worry Kyoko (Mummy's Only Looking for Her Hand in the Snow)" (Note: The performance of "Don't Worry Kyoko" had been over 20 minutes in length.) at the Lyceum Ballroom in London, for a UNICEF charity show billed as the "Peace for Christmas Concert". In addition to Lennon and Ono, the supergroup featured George Harrison, The Who's drummer Keith Moon, Delaney & Bonnie, Billy Preston and Legs Larry Smith, among others. Harrison, who had been touring with Delaney & Bonnie, received a phone call from Lennon and was excited about the prospect of performing with him. The ballroom had its interior covered by posters declaring "WAR IS OVER, if you want it, love John and Yoko." For "Cold Turkey", Ono sat inside a white bag located near Lennon's feet, later jumping out of the bag during "Don't Worry Kyoko (Mummy's Only Looking for Her Hand in the Snow)", facing the crowd and screaming at them. Toward the end of the latter performance, Ono broke down crying. An early mix of the two tracks was produced by the Abbey Road Studios engineers on 26 November 1970 and was sent to Lennon and Ono. The album also featured a recording of Lennon and Ono performing with Frank Zappa and The Mothers of Invention at the Fillmore East on 6 June 1971, a collaboration instigated by Andy Warhol. Ono arranged for the performance to be filmed, and Klaus Voormann overdubbed some of his bass parts at a later date.

Throughout January, until the 21st, Lennon mixed the live album at the Record Plant. Lennon also mixed the recordings of the John Sinclair rally, as well as the Apollo Theatre and Lyceum Ballroom performances, for possible release as EPs; however, only the Lyceum performance was released. Lennon and Ono, with the assistance of studio drummer Jim Keltner, hired Elephant's Memory, a local band known for their hard partying and anti-establishment musical style, to back them for a series of albums and live performances. Lennon once again brought in Phil Spector to co-produce the new studio album, which was completed on 20 March 1972. Around this time, Lennon and Ono were producing Elephant's Memory's self-titled album. Several jams were recorded, featuring Lennon and Elephant's Memory, all of which remained unreleased: "Don't Be Cruel", "Hound Dog", "Send Me Some Lovin'", "Roll Over Beethoven", "Whole Lotta Shakin' Goin' On", "It'll Be Me", "Not Fade Away", "Ain't That a Shame" and "Caribbean".

== Music and lyrics ==
The opening song of the studio album, "Woman Is the Nigger of the World" (a phrase Ono had coined in the late 1960s), was intended as a negation of sexism and was also issued as a single in the US to controversial reaction, and – as a consequence – little airplay. The Lennons went to great lengths (including a press conference attended by staff from Jet and Ebony magazines) to explain that the word "nigger" was not meant as an affront to black people. A quote from Ron Dellums, referring to the use of the word "nigger", appeared in an issue of Billboard (referred to on an episode of The Dick Cavett Show). Lennon's other tracks include the biographical "New York City", a Chuck Berry-styled rocker that details the Lennons' early months in their new home, as well as "John Sinclair", his musical plea for Sinclair's release from a ten-year sentence for giving two marijuana joints to an undercover policewoman.

Ono, a feminist, responds musically with "Sisters, O Sisters", tackles the lacking education system with "Born in a Prison", and celebrates a culture of one in "We're All Water". Together, Lennon and Ono lament police brutality in "Attica State", the hardships of war-torn Northern Ireland in "Sunday Bloody Sunday" and "The Luck of the Irish" (see Bloody Sunday), and pay tribute to Angela Davis with "Angela".

== Release ==
Some Time in New York City was issued in the US on 12 June 1972 but delayed until 15 September in the UK, due to a dispute with Northern Songs over publishing rights on songs co-written by Lennon and Ono. The album was packaged like a newspaper (an approach previously employed on The Four Seasons' The Genuine Imitation Life Gazette, Jefferson Airplane's Volunteers and Jethro Tull's Thick as a Brick), depicting the events covered in the album's songs, causing even more consternation with an image of Richard Nixon and Mao Zedong dancing nude together. (The photo was stickered over on many of the issued copies, with a non-removable seal.)

With most of the gatefold cover space taken up by printed lyrics and photographs, the album credits appeared on the first disc's inner sleeve. The customised label, featuring the face of Lennon morphing into Ono's, was created by Iain Macmillan. The inner sleeve for Live Jam featured Lennon's doodling over the cover of Zappa's album Fillmore East – June 1971, adding his credits and commentary to Zappa's.

Initial copies of the US edition included a photograph of the Statue of Liberty and a mailable petition to allow citizenship for John and Yoko. Also, the message "John and Yoko forever Peace on earth and goodwill to all men '72" is inscribed in the dead wax on Side 1.

Although the UK release managed a number 11 chart peak, it only went to number 48 in the US. Lennon was reportedly stunned by the album's failure and consequently did not record new music for almost a year.

== Critical reception ==
Professional ratings
Review scores
Source	Rating
AllMusic	2.5/5 stars
Boston Phoenix	1/4 stars
Christgau's Record Guide	C
Mojo	2/5 stars
MusicHound	3/5
Paste	3/5 stars
The Rolling Stone Album Guide	2.5/5 stars
Uncut	2/5 stars

On release, Some Time in New York City provided a startling contrast for listeners expecting a repeat of the well-received Imagine in 1971. According to author Robert Rodriguez, the new album received "abysmal reviews". In a scathing critique published in Rolling Stone, Stephen Holden wrote that "the Lennons should be commended for their daring", but not before calling the album "incipient artistic suicide". Holden added: "except for 'John Sinclair' the songs are awful. The tunes are shallow and derivative and the words little more than sloppy nursery-rhymes that patronise the issues and individuals they seek to exalt. Only a monomaniacal smugness could allow the Lennons to think that this witless doggerel wouldn't insult the intelligence and feelings of any audience."

Dave Marsh wrote a mixed review for Creem, stating that "it's not half bad. It may be 49.9% bad, but not half." The Milwaukee Sentinel declared that John and Yoko had produced "another crude, superficial look at trendy leftist politics and have plunged even further into their endless echo chamber". In the NME, Tony Tyler presented his album review in the form of an open letter, titled "Lennon, you're a pathetic, ageing revolutionary". After criticising Lennon for "the general tastelessness of the presentation", particularly the album's lyrics and cover art, Tyler concluded: "Don't rely on cant and rigidity. Don't alienate. Stimulate. You know, like you used to."

More recently, Garry Mulholland of Uncut magazine has described Some Time in New York City as "a contender for the worst LP by a major musical figure, its list of '70s left-wing clichés hamstrung by the utter absence of conviction within the melodies and lyrics". Writing in the Boston Phoenix in 2005, Eliot Wilder said that listening to the album was "a painful experience". Although he conceded that Lennon "had his heart in the right place", Wilder opined: "these tracks – pedantic, topical, elitist – show that a latter-day Dylan he was not ... Refer to the Beatles' 'Revolution' or his own 'Give Peace a Chance' if you need a dose of John the Protest Singer." More impressed, Mark Kemp of Paste considered that "the album has been unfairly chastised", identifying "Woman Is the Nigger of the World" as "one of Lennon's finest songs" and Ono's "Born in a Prison" as another highlight.

== Legacy ==
On 30 August 1972, Lennon and Ono performed two benefit concerts for the Willowbrook State School for the mentally challenged at Madison Square Garden, at friend Geraldo Rivera's request. The shows, known as One to One, were filmed and recorded, with the evening show broadcast on ABC Television, and the earlier matinée show compiled for release as the 1986 live album and video, Live in New York City. New York mayor John Lindsay declared the date "One to One Day", and the performances proved to be Lennon's last full live concerts.

Frank Zappa criticized the presentation of the Mothers' performance on Some Time in New York City, as the vocals of Mark Volman and Howard Kaylan had been removed, and Zappa did not receive writing credit for "King Kong", which was wrongly identified on this release as "Jamrag". He and Lennon had also agreed that each would release their own version of the performance, but Zappa was legally prevented from issuing his version, which did not appear until the release of Playground Psychotics in 1992.

After Lennon's death, the album, along with seven other Lennon albums, was reissued by EMI as part of a box set, released in the UK on 15 June 1981. (Note: UK EMI JLB8) Some Time in New York City was remixed, remastered and reissued in November 2005 as a single CD, removing, in the process, several of the Live Jam cuts, while adding "Happy Xmas (War Is Over)" and "Listen, the Snow Is Falling". On this remastered release, "John Sinclair" and "Attica State" were not remixed. In 2010, the album was digitally remastered and reissued on CD in its original double album format.

Another remix (part of the "ultimate mix" campaign following the Imagine, Plastic Ono Band, and Gimme Some Truth albums) was slated for 2022, but was delayed for unknown reasons. After releasing the ultimate mix of Lennon's following album Mind Games in July 2024, the ultimate mix of Some Time in New York City was revisited, where the One to One shows were the main focus. Retitled, Power to the People, the set included both One to One shows, as well as a reimagined version of Some Time in New York City, simply titled New York City (The Ultimate Mixes), where "Woman is the Nigger of the World" was dropped from the track listing. "New York City" was moved up as the opening track, while "Sunday Bloody Sunday" and "John Sinclair" have also been extended. This collection was released on October 10, 2025.

== Track listing ==
Some Time in New York City

Side one
No.	Title	Writer(s)	Length
1.	"Woman Is the Nigger of the World"	John Lennon; Yoko Ono	5:15
2.	"Sisters, O Sisters"	Ono	3:46
3.	"Attica State"	Lennon; Ono	2:54
4.	"Born in a Prison"	Ono	4:03
5.	"New York City"	Lennon	4:30
Total length:			20:28

Side two
No.	Title	Writer(s)	Length
1.	"Sunday Bloody Sunday"	Lennon; Ono	5:00
2.	"The Luck of the Irish"	Lennon; Ono	2:56
3.	"John Sinclair"	Lennon	3:28
4.	"Angela"	Lennon; Ono	4:06
5.	"We're All Water"	Ono	7:11
Total length:			22:41

Live Jam

Side one
No.	Title	Writer(s)	Length
1.	"Cold Turkey"	Lennon	8:35
2.	"Don't Worry Kyoko"	Ono	16:01
Total length:			24:36

Side two
No.	Title	Writer(s)	Length
1.	"Well (Baby Please Don't Go)"	Walter Ward	4:41
2.	"Jamrag"	Frank Zappa (credited to Lennon and Ono)	5:36
3.	"Scumbag"	Lennon; Ono; Zappa	4:27
4.	"Aü"	Lennon; Ono	8:04
Total length:			22:48

Notes:

- Side one of Live Jam recorded live on 15 December 1969 at the Lyceum Ballroom in London, England, for a UNICEF charity concert with George Harrison
- Side two of Live Jam recorded live on 6 June 1971 at the Fillmore East in New York City with Frank Zappa and The Mothers of Invention
- "Jamrag" was originally written by Frank Zappa, titled "King Kong". Lennon and Ono claimed copyright, giving "King Kong" a new title (British slang for sanitary towel)
- Frank Zappa's version of the live recordings captured on side four of Some Time in New York City was released in 1992 on Frank Zappa's album Playground Psychotics. These mixes/edits make Zappa and his band more prominent in the mix (most notably in the song "Scumbag" where Mark Volman and Howard Kaylan's vocals are audible) than they had been on Some Time in New York City.

=== 2005 CD reissue ===
This remixed/remastered edition, issued on a single disc, omits much of the live material with Zappa and includes "Listen, the Snow Is Falling" & "Happy Xmas (War Is Over)" as bonus tracks. Some of the track times, notably for "We're All Water" and "Don't Worry Kyoko", differ from those on the original vinyl LPs.

All tracks are written by John Lennon & Yoko Ono, except where noted.

2005 CD reissue
No.	Title	Writer(s)	Length
1.	"Woman Is the Nigger of the World"	Lennon; Ono	5:17
2.	"Sisters, O Sisters"	Ono	3:48
3.	"Attica State"	Lennon; Ono	2:55
4.	"Born in a Prison"	Ono	4:05
5.	"New York City"	Lennon	4:29
6.	"Sunday Bloody Sunday"	Lennon; Ono	5:03
7.	"The Luck of the Irish"	Lennon; Ono	2:59
8.	"John Sinclair"	Lennon	3:30
9.	"Angela"	Lennon; Ono	4:08
10.	"We're All Water"	Ono	5:19
11.	"Cold Turkey" (Live Jam)	Lennon	8:35
12.	"Don't Worry Kyoko" (Live Jam)	Ono	15:20
13.	"Well (Baby Please Don't Go)" (Live Jam)	Ward	4:33

Bonus tracks
No.	Title	Writer(s)	Length
14.	"Listen, the Snow Is Falling"	Ono	3:06
15.	"Happy Xmas (War Is Over)"	Lennon; Ono	3:34
Total length:			90:52

== Personnel ==
=== Studio album ===
- John Lennon – guitars, Dobro, vocals
- Yoko Ono – vocals
- Jim Keltner – drums, percussion
- Elephant's Memory:
  - Stan Bronstein – saxophone, flute
  - Wayne 'Tex' Gabriel – guitar
  - Richard Frank Jr. – drums, percussion
  - Adam Ippolito – piano, organ
  - Gary Van Scyoc – bass guitar
  - John La Bosca – piano

=== Live Jam ===
All credits taken from Lennon's handwritten credits on the Live Jam inner sleeve.

15 December 1969

- John Lennon – guitar, vocals
- Yoko Ono – bag, vocals

For everyone except himself and Ono, Lennon made up pseudonyms:

- Eric Clapton ('Derek Claptoe') – guitar
- Delaney & Bonnie ('Bilanie & Donnie') – guitar, percussion (and friends, brass, percussion)
- Jim Gordon ('Jim Bordom') – drums
- George Harrison ('George Harrisong') – guitar
- Nicky Hopkins ('Sticky Topkins') – electric piano (overdubbed in N.Y. as organ was lost)
- Bobby Keys ('Robbie Knees') – saxophone
- Jim Price – trumpet
- Keith Moon ('Kief Spoon') – drums
- Billy Preston ('Billy Presstud') – organ
- Klaus Voormann ('Raus Doorman') – bass
- Alan White ('Dallas White') – drums

The audience in attendance is credited on the label as "a cast of 1000's" and on the dust jacket as a "star-studded cast of thousands!!"

Uncredited

- Jim Price – trumpet

6 June 1971

- John Lennon – guitar, vocals
- Yoko Ono – bag, vocals
- Aynsley Dunbar – drums
- Bob Harris – keyboards, vocals
- Howard Kaylan – vocals
- Jim Pons – bass guitar, vocals
- Don Preston – Mini-Moog
- Ian Underwood – keyboard, vocals, woodwinds
- Mark Volman – vocals
- Klaus Voormann – bass guitar, vocals
- Frank Zappa – guitar, vocals

== Charts ==
Chart performance for Some Time in New York City
Chart (1972–1973)	Peak position
Australia (Kent Music Report Chart)	10
Italian Albums (Musica e dischi)	6
Japanese Oricon LPs Chart	15
Norwegian VG-lista Albums Chart	2
UK Albums Chart	11
US Billboard 200	48
US Record World Album Chart	30
US Cash Box Top 100 Albums	26
Yugoslavia LPs	6

2023 chart performance for Some Time in New York City
Chart (2023)	Peak position
Canadian Albums (Billboard)	77
