= LennoNYC =

- Directed by: Michael Epstein
- Written by: Michael Epstein
- Production companies: Two Lefts Don't Make a Right; Dakota Group
- Release date: September 25, 2010 (New York City)
- Running time: 115 minutes
- Country: United States
- Language: English

LennoNYC (styled LENNONYC) is a 2010 documentary film written and directed by Michael Epstein about the life of John Lennon in New York City, after the breakup of the Beatles. The film premiered at the New York Film Festival and was shown at a free public screening in Central Park on October 9, which would have been Lennon's 70th birthday. It first aired on the PBS series American Masters on November 22 and received a Peabody Award in 2010.

Interviewed in film are Yoko Ono, members of the Elephant's Memory band that played with Lennon and Ono in New York, Elton John, Dick Cavett, photographer Bob Gruen and Geraldo Rivera, who talks about a news report of his that inspired Lennon and Ono to stage the One to One benefit concert in 1972. However, the film also follows Lennon out of New York to Los Angeles during his so-called "lost weekend" period, when he briefly split from Ono.
