= Woman Is the Nigger of the World =

1972 song by John Lennon and Yoko Ono

- Front cover of the song

Single by John Lennon and Yoko Ono as Plastic Ono Band

from the album Some Time in New York City
- B-side: "Sisters, O Sisters" (Yoko Ono)
- Released: 24 April 1972
- Recorded: 13 February – 8 March 1972
- Studio: Record Plant East, New York City
- Genre: Rock; R&B; feminist music
- Length: 5:15
- Label: Apple
- Songwriters: John Lennon; Yoko Ono
- Producers: John Lennon; Yoko Ono; Phil Spector

John Lennon and Yoko Ono as Plastic Ono Band singles chronology
"Happy Xmas (War Is Over)" (1971)	"Woman Is the Nigger of the World" (1972)	"Mind Games" (1973)

"Woman Is the Nigger of the World" is a song by John Lennon and Yoko Ono with Elephant's Memory from their 1972 album Some Time in New York City. The song was produced by Lennon, Ono and Phil Spector. Released as the only single from the album in the United States, the song sparked controversy at the time due to the use of the word nigger in the lyrics, and many radio stations refused to play the song as a result.

== Composition ==
The phrase "woman is the nigger of the world" was coined by Yoko Ono in an interview on 12 December 1968, then released on Nova magazine in 1969 and quoted on the magazine's cover, with Ono making the claim that women were the most oppressed group in the world. Literary analysts note that the phrase owes much to Zora Neale Hurston's novel Their Eyes Were Watching God, in which the protagonist Janie Crawford's grandmother says "De nigger woman is de mule uh de world so fur as Ah can see." Lennon and Ono wrote the song in the summer of 1969. By then, Ono's artistic and philosophical ideas had seeped into Lennon; in response to Paul McCartney suggesting in 1971 they meet alone, without their wives present, Lennon wrote: "I thought you'd understood BY NOW that I'm JOHNANDYOKO." Lennon was originally against the statement Yoko made, but when he saw the cover of Nova, it changed his mind. Recording for the song began on 13 February 1972, and ended on 8 March of that year.

In a summer 1972 interview on The Dick Cavett Show, Lennon said that Irish revolutionary James Connolly was an inspiration for the song. Lennon cited Connolly's statement that "the female worker is the slave of the slaves" in explaining the pro-feminist inspiration behind the song.

So I said, "Come on Yoko, this is it. I agree with you now. (...) That's what Connolly said. (...) And so we sat down together, and we tried to write the song together as best as we could in a three or four minute song. And it's called Woman Is the Nigger of the World.

— Lennon on The Dick Cavett Show.

== Release and reception ==
Due to its use of the racial epithet nigger and what was criticised as an inappropriate comparison of sexism to racism against black Americans, most radio stations in the United States declined to play the record. It was released in the US on 24 April 1972 and peaked at number 57 on the Billboard Hot 100, based primarily on sales, making it Lennon's lowest-charting US single in his lifetime. The song also charted at number 93 on the Cash Box Top 100.

The National Organization for Women (NOW) awarded Lennon and Ono a "Positive Image of Women" citation for the song's "strong pro-feminist statement" in August 1972. Cash Box described the song as the "most powerful epic to come out of the women's movement so far." In the 1 June 1972 issue of Jet magazine, Apple Records ran an ad for the song with a purported quote from Congressman Ron Dellums, a founding member of the Congressional Black Caucus, claiming that he "agreed" with Lennon and Ono that "women are the niggers of the world." In the 15 June issue, Dellums wrote a letter in response rejecting that he had "agreed" with Lennon and Ono. He clarified that "In a white male-dominated society that sees the role of women as bed-partners, broom pushers, bottle washers, typists and cooks, women are niggers in THIS society." In a 2009 documentary about his life and work, Phil Spector argued that he is not taken seriously as an artist; he says Bob Dylan has this distinction because his music spoke about society, even though he himself had worked on "Spanish Harlem" and "Woman Is the Nigger of the World".

=== Critique ===
Record World said that "with hard rock backing and expert guitar work from Elephant's Memory, John and Yoko deliver the message suggested by the title" and called it "strong stuff, musically and lyrically." The A.V. Club praised the messaging of the song, stating that it "makes a valid point, and one that’s revolutionary for the time". Classic Rock critic Rob Hughes rated it as Lennon's 9th best political song, and Rolling Stone listed the song as one of Lennon's 20 most underrated songs. Conversely, however, Todd Mealy, an author, critiqued the song, and Lennon's defence of the song, as demonstrating "a lack of nuanced and empathetic knowledge" about the past oppression of African-descended people. Ta-Nehisi Coates used the song in a more broad context of race relations, questioning whether Lennon and Ono "really had an understanding of what it meant to be a nigger". Far Out Magazine opined that the song was "blunt, unambiguous, and not memorable enough to truly mean anything".

== Response to criticism ==
Through radio and television interviews, Lennon described his use of the term nigger as referring to any oppressed person. Apple Records placed an advertisement for the single in the 6 May issue of Billboard magazine featuring a recent statement, unrelated to the song, by prominent black Congressman Ron Dellums to demonstrate the broader use of the term. Lennon also referred to Dellums's statement during an appearance on The Dick Cavett Show, where he and Ono performed the song with the band Elephant's Memory. Because of the controversial title, ABC asked Cavett to apologise to the audience in advance for the song's content; otherwise the performance would not have been shown. Cavett disliked giving the statement, saying in the 2010 documentary LENNONYC:

I had John and Yoko on, and the suits said: "We're gonna write a little insert just before the song for you to say." I said, "You are going to censor my guests after I get them on the show? This is ludicrous." So they wrote this thing, and I went in and taped it in order to retain the song. About 600 protests did come in. None of them about the song! All of them about, quote: "that mealy-mouthed statement you forced Dick to say before the show. Don't you believe we're grown up..." Oh, God. It was wonderful in that sense; it gave me hope for the republic.

Lennon visited the offices of Ebony and Jet magazines with comedian/activist Dick Gregory and appeared in a cover story, "Ex-Beatle Tells How Black Stars Changed His Life", in the 26 October 1972 issue of Jet. Lennon defended the song, stating: "I know it was political with a capital P, but that was what I had in my bag at the time, and I wasn't just going to throw them away because they were political", before going on to say he still liked the song. Lennon and Yoko would continue to defend the song in multiple 1980 interviews, including John Lennon's last interview on 8 December 1980. Yoko would continue expressing support for the song, admitting its controversial nature in a 2015 interview.

== Reissues ==
An edited version of the song was included on the 1975 compilation album Shaved Fish. The song was reissued as the B-side to "Stand by Me" on 4 April 1977. The song is absent from the Gimme Some Truth. The Ultimate Mixes box set, but does appear on the John Lennon Signature Box. The song was omitted from the new mix of Some Time in New York City, released on 10 October 2025 as part of the Power to the People box set, despite being the album’s original opening track.

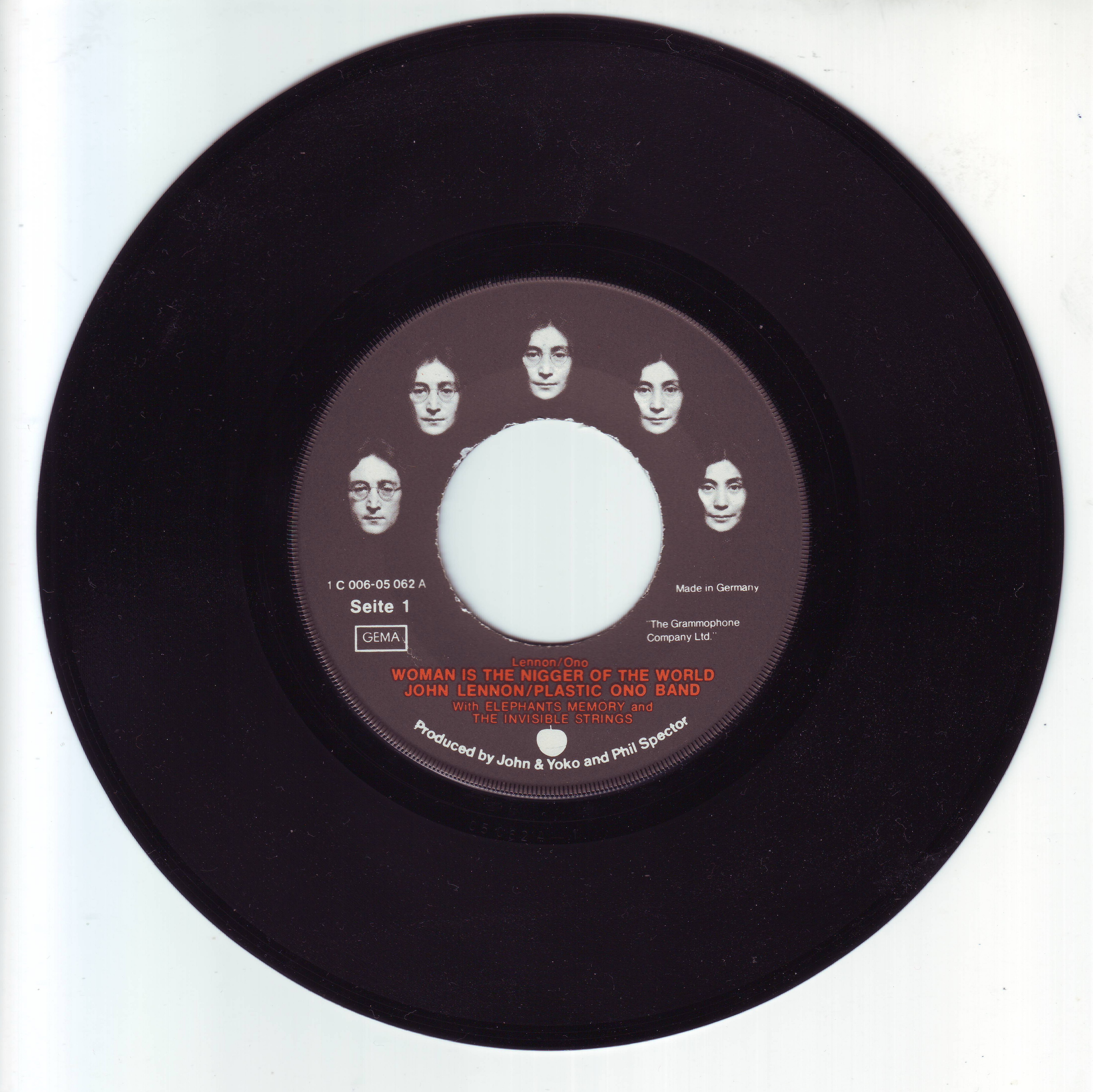
Austrian single vinyl

== In popular culture ==
Guns N' Roses singer Axl Rose referenced the song when defending his use of slurs in his song "One in a Million". An episode of the television series Better Things, written by Pamela Adlon and Louis C.K., named "Woman is the Something of the Something", features characters discussing the saying "woman is the nigger of the world".

== Chart performance ==
Chart (1972)	Peak position
Belgium (Ultratop 50 Flanders)	20
Belgium (Ultratop 50 Wallonia)	45
Canada Top Singles (RPM)	73
Denmark (IFPI)	9
Italy (Musica e dischi)	12
Japan (Oricon Singles Chart)	38
Netherlands (Dutch Top 40)	24
Netherlands (Single Top 100)	21
US Billboard Hot 100	57
US Cash Box Top 100	93

== Personnel ==
Personnel on the single and Some Time in New York City recording are:

- John Lennon – vocals, guitar
- Stan Bronstein – tenor saxophone
- Gary Van Scyoc – bass
- Adam Ippolito – piano, organ
- Wayne "Tex" Gabriel – guitar
- Richard Frank Jr. – drums, percussion
- Jim Keltner – drums

== See also ==
- White nigger
