= Elephant's Memory =

American rock band

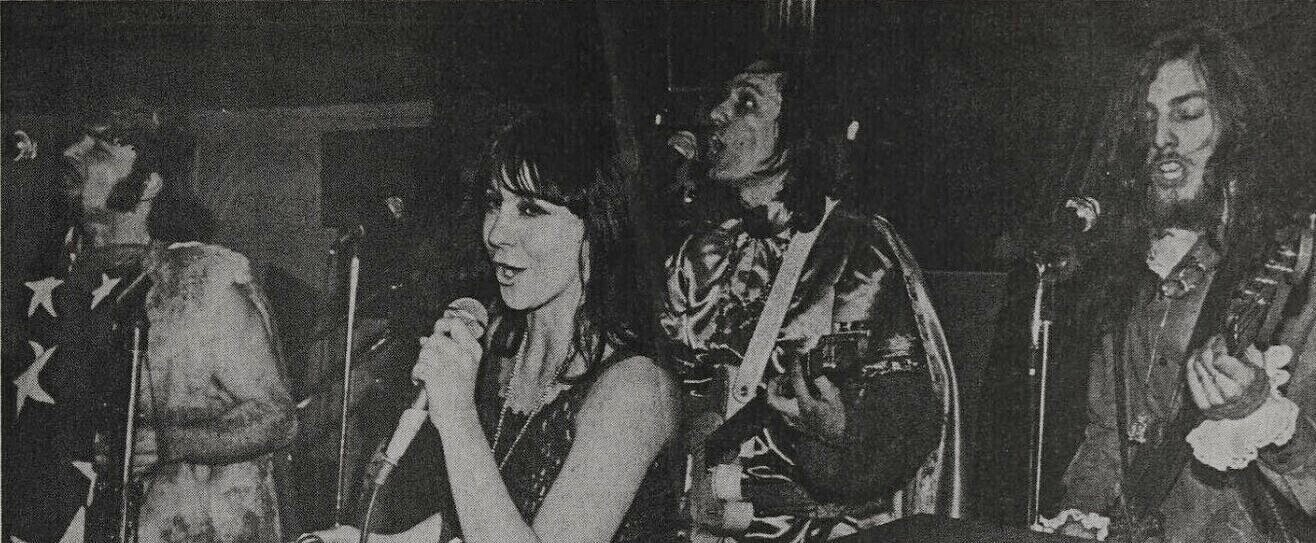
- The band circa 1969

Background information
- Origin: New York City, U.S.
- Genres: Psychedelic rock, experimental rock, soul
- Years active: 1967–c. 1976
- Labels: Metromedia; Apple; Manticore

Elephant's Memory (also billed as Elephants Memory, without the apostrophe) was an American rock band formed in New York City in the late 1960s, known primarily for backing John Lennon and Yoko Ono from late 1971 to 1973 under their Plastic Ono Band, featuring on the pair's 1972 album Some Time in New York City.

== History ==
=== Formation and early career (1967–1972) ===
Elephant's Memory was formed between 1967 and 1968, by Stan Bronstein (saxophone, clarinet, and vocals) and Rick Frank Jr. (drums). In 1968, they briefly added Carly Simon as a vocalist. By 1969, the line-up had expanded to include John Ward (bass) with Danny Adler (guitar and keyboards) who originally performed in the Blues Doctors (1964–1966), Chester Ayers (guitar), Myron Yules (bass trombone), R. Sussmann (keyboards), Michal Shapiro (vocals), Guy Peritore (guitar and vocals), David Cohen (guitar, keyboards, and vocals), and Michael Rose on guitar.

Two of the band's songs, "Jungle Gym at the Zoo" and "Old Man Willow", appeared on the 1969 soundtrack to the film Midnight Cowboy. Elephant's Memory received a gold disc for their contribution to the soundtrack.

In 1970, the band had a minor hit single with the song "Mongoose" on Metromedia Records, peaking at number 50 on the Hot 100 on October 17, 1970, but at number 5 on Chicago's WCFL on November 23, 1970 and reaching number 1 in Pittsburgh on KQV. In Canada, "Mongoose" reached number 71 on September 26, 1970. In 1971 the band released the single "Skyscraper Commando," of which Record World said "the lyric is powerful and the instrumental track is right up there with 'Mongoose'."

Between 1970 and 1973, the line-up remained more or less constant around Bronstein and Frank, together with guitarists Wayne "Tex" Gabriel, keyboardist Adam Ippolito and bassist Gary Van Scyoc.

=== Work with Lennon and Ono, and later career (1972–1976) ===
Known around the Greenwich Village area as a politically active street band, Elephant's Memory backed Lennon and Ono on their album Some Time in New York City during recording sessions in March 1972. The album was released in June 1972 in the United States, and in September 1972 in the UK.

Later in 1972, they were billed as the Plastic Ono Elephant's Memory Band and performed with Lennon and Ono on various TV shows, albums and concerts. On August 30, 1972, with the addition of John Ward on bass and Jim Keltner on drums, the band played with Lennon and Ono at the famous One to One Concert organized by Geraldo Rivera, to benefit the Willowbrook State School for children with intellectual disabilities. The concert was filmed and recorded, later released in February 1986 as the album Live in New York City. On September 4, they played live again with Lennon and Ono at the Jerry Lewis MDA Labor Day Telethon, performing "Imagine", "Now or Never" and "Give Peace A Chance".

In April and May 1972, the band recorded their second self-titled album (i.e. their third album), co-produced by John Lennon and Yoko Ono, and released on the Beatles' Apple Records label, together with an accompanying single "Power Boogie." Billboard called it a "selection of good, strong unpretentious rock." It also contains various contributions by Lennon himself on guitar and vocals. This album has never been re-issued on compact disc. From October to November, the band recorded material for Ono's double album Approximately Infinite Universe, released in January 1973.

On September 5, 1973, the band appeared at the Hells Angels "Pirate Party" held on the SS Bay Belle, together with a band featuring Jerry Garcia. This performance was later featured in the 1983 documentary film Hells Angels Forever.

The line-up of Elephant's Memory included at various times, Daria Price on castanets, Robert O'Leary on bass, and John La Bosca on piano. However, the line-up that recorded Angels Forever in 1974, was Stan Bronstein and Richard Frank, plus Gary Van Scyoc on bass, Chris Robison and Jon Sachs.

In 2010, Van Scyoc and Ippolito appeared in LENNONYC, a documentary about John Lennon for the PBS American Masters series.

In May 2010, guitarist Wayne "Tex" Gabriel died at the age of 59.

== Discography ==
=== Studio albums ===
- Elephant's Memory (1969, No. 200 US)
- Take It to the Streets (1970)
- Elephant's Memory (1972) (Apple Records), produced by John Lennon & Yoko Ono
- Angels Forever (1974)

=== Collaborations ===
- Island in the Sky (1968, album by The Tuneful Trolley)
  - several members of Elephant's Memory performed the brass heard on the LP.
- Midnight Cowboy soundtrack (1969), songs "Jungle Gym At The Zoo" and "Old Man Willow"
- Some Time in New York City (1972), John Lennon & Yoko Ono album, Elephant's Memory did session work
- Approximately Infinite Universe (1973), Yoko Ono album, Elephant's Memory did session work
- Bio (1973), Chuck Berry album
- Our Island Music (1976), credited to Stan Bronstein / Elephant's Memory Band
- Live in New York City (1986), John Lennon (posthumous) album, recorded in 1972
