= Cold Turkey =

1969 single by Plastic Ono Band

Single by Plastic Ono Band
- B-side: "Don't Worry Kyoko (Mummy's Only Looking for a Hand in the Snow)" (Yoko Ono)
- Released: 20 October 1969
- Recorded: 30 September 1969
- Studio: EMI, London
- Genre: Hard rock; blues rock
- Length: 5:01
- Label: Apple
- Songwriter: John Lennon
- Producers: John Lennon; Yoko Ono

Plastic Ono Band singles chronology
"Give Peace a Chance" (1969)	"Cold Turkey" (1969)	"Instant Karma!" (1970)

"Cold Turkey" is a song written by John Lennon and released as a single in September 1969 by the Plastic Ono Band on Apple Records. It is the second solo single issued by Lennon and it peaked at number 30 on the Billboard Hot 100 and number 14 on the UK Singles Chart. The song's first appearance on an album was Live Peace in Toronto 1969 where the song had been performed live on 13 September 1969 with Lennon reading the lyrics off a clip-board.

== Writing and recording ==
According to Peter Brown in his book The Love You Make, the song was written in a "creative outburst" following Lennon and Yoko Ono going "cold turkey" from their brief heroin addictions, as well as the direct effect of withdrawal syndrome. Brown states that Lennon presented the song to Paul McCartney as a potential single by the Beatles, as they were finishing recording for their Abbey Road album. This was refused. The track was eventually released as a Plastic Ono Band single, with sole writing credits to Lennon. Lennon referred ambiguously to his substance abuse in some songs on the White Album in 1968, where the compositions were mostly individual and introspective, including "Everybody's Got Something to Hide Except Me and My Monkey" and "Happiness Is a Warm Gun", as well as on other songs from previous Beatles albums.

"Cold Turkey" was the first song Lennon wrote for which he took sole credit; his previous compositions, including his first single release, "Give Peace a Chance", were attributed to the Lennon–McCartney partnership, although the credit for "Give Peace a Chance" was later changed to Lennon alone.

In the last major interview with John Lennon and Yoko Ono in 1980, published by David Sheff in his book All We Are Saying, Lennon explained the anti-drug meaning of the song:

"Cold Turkey" is self-explanatory. It was banned again all over the American radio (after "The Ballad of John and Yoko" for other reasons), so it never got off the ground. They were thinking I was promoting heroin, but instead... They're so stupid about drugs! They're always arresting smugglers or kids with a few joints in their pocket. They never face the reality. They're not looking at the cause of the drug problem. Why is everybody taking drugs? To escape from what? Is life so terrible? Do we live in such a terrible situation that we can't do anything about it without reinforcement from alcohol or tobacco or sleeping pills? I'm not preaching about 'em. I'm just saying a drug is a drug, you know. Why we take them is important, not who's selling it to whom on the corner.

"Cold Turkey" was recorded in Abbey Road Studio 2, and features Eric Clapton. There are other versions besides the single, several of which are acoustic, and a live version included on Live in New York City that features Ono adding vocalizations.

== Release and reception ==
The single was released with a standard green Apple label, with the words "Play Loud" printed on the spindle plug of the UK pressing and above and beneath the spindle hole of the US pressing. This instruction would also appear on the labels of Lennon's next solo single, "Instant Karma!".

Cash Box described the song as "brilliant, controversial and an absolute smash." Record World called it "a chilling musical rendition of withdrawal."

"Cold Turkey" rose to number 14 on the UK Singles Chart on 15 November 1969. On 22 November, "Cold Turkey" dropped to number 15, and on 25 November Lennon returned his MBE to Buckingham Palace saying "I am returning this MBE in protest against Britain's involvement in the Nigeria-Biafra thing, against our support of America in Vietnam, and against 'Cold Turkey' slipping down the charts. With love, John Lennon of Bag." In March 2005, Q magazine placed "Cold Turkey" at number 74 in its list of the 100 Greatest Guitar Tracks. Stereogum contributors Timothy and Elizabeth Bracy rated "Cold Turkey" as Lennon's 10th best solo song, calling it a "tough but rewarding listen" that "stressfully gallops out the gate with a jittery ferociousness that is simultaneously cathartic and claustrophobic."

== Cover art ==
The original cover art for the single was made by English photographer David Nutter (older brother of the iconic tailor Tommy Nutter), who was John and Yoko Ono's regular photographer at the time.

Lennon asked Nutter to make a positive print of an X-ray of his own head, taken apparently at Lawson Memorial Hospital in Golspie, Scotland, place where he was treated in July 1969. This was after he was injured in a family car accident on a remote single-track road between Tongue and Durness, near Loch Eriboll.

Nutter created the image by superimposing Lennon's eyes with his round glasses, like a surreal skeletal cover, although this is not particularly clear in its reference to the song. In fact, the image was created at a time when Lennon was eager to define his eccentric personality as a solo artist, even being a member of The Beatles.

An alternative sleeve with the X-ray photographs of John and Yoko side by side, rather than on either side of the cover, was issued in several European countries. The Japanese version includes a colour photo of both in a smaller size.

== Live performances ==
Its first public performance on 13 September 1969, was recorded and released on the Live Peace in Toronto 1969 album by Plastic Ono Band which included Lennon, Yoko Ono, Eric Clapton, Klaus Voormann, and Alan White. Yoko introduced it as the newest song written by John; John added that the band had never played the song together as a group before. He also performed this song on 15 December 1969, along with "Don't Worry Kyoko (Mummy's Only Looking for Her Hand in the Snow)", at the Lyceum Ballroom with more members of the Plastic Ono Band. This version would be available on his Some Time in New York City album. Lennon performed the song again, at two Madison Square Garden shows, on 30 August 1972.

== Personnel ==
According to author John C. Winn:

- John Lennon – lead and harmony vocals, guitars
- Eric Clapton – guitar
- Klaus Voormann – bass
- Ringo Starr – drums

== Chart performance ==
Chart (1969)	Peak position
Canadian RPM Singles Chart	30
Dutch Top 40	39
UK Singles Chart	14
Chart (1970)	Peak position
US Billboard Pop Singles	30
US Cashbox Top 100	32

== Cover versions ==
- Freddie Hubbard recorded an instrumental jazz version in 1970, as an outtake from his CTI Records album, Red Clay. Hubbard's version, featuring Herbie Hancock, Joe Henderson, Ron Carter and Lenny White, is influenced by funk music.
- A live recording appears on the 1979 LP A Can of Bees by the Soft Boys.
- Pas De Deux, a Belgian trio, recorded a cover in 1983 (with lead vocals by Walter Verdin). They also released a music video, which was directed by Marcel Vanthilt and filmed by Paul de Cock.
- The Godfathers recorded a version in 1986 with producer Vic Maile. It was first released on a 1986 compilation album called Hit by Hit that included their three early 12" singles.
- PiL founder/guitarist Keith Levene covered the song on his 1989 solo album Violent Opposition.
- Cheap Trick recorded two versions in 1994. One went on the album Working Class Hero: A Tribute to John Lennon, and the other was released on one of the Bun E.'s Basement Bootleg albums.
- Beki Bondage of Vice Squad released a version on her 2000 solo covers album, also called Cold Turkey.
- Lenny Kravitz recorded a version for the 2007 benefit album Instant Karma: The Amnesty International Campaign to Save Darfur.
- Billy Talent covered it on the B-side of their single "Rusted from the Rain" in 2009.
- Alice Cooper covered the song with his supergroup Hollywood Vampires on their debut album, released 11 September 2015. "We weren't going to do 'Imagine'," he noted. "'Let's do something that really represented the John that we knew."
