= Yoko Ono discography =

Recordings by the Japanese artist

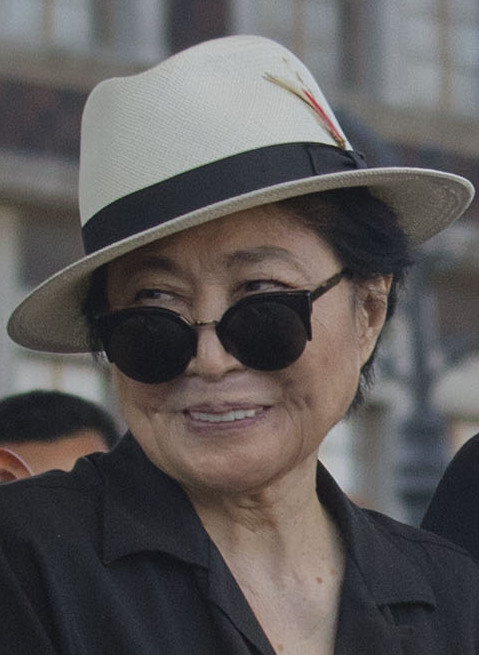
- Ono in February 2016
- Studio albums: 14
- Singles: 40
- Collaborative albums: 8

Japanese multimedia artist, singer and songwriter Yoko Ono has released 14 studio albums, eight collaborative albums, and 40 singles as a lead artist. Married to English singer-songwriter and the Beatles member John Lennon until his murder in 1980, she has contributed several B-sides to his singles from late 1960s to the 1980s. Ono released her debut studio album Yoko Ono/Plastic Ono Band in December 1970, faring poorly in the United States. Similar moderate success was achieved with her follow-up records Fly (1971) and Approximately Infinite Universe (1973).

Simultaneously, she released several collaborative albums with Lennon, starting with their Unfinished Music series spawning Two Virgins (1968) and Life with the Lions (1969). Double Fantasy, released three weeks prior to Lennon's murder in 1980, went on to gain widespread commercial success worldwide, topping the charts in the United Kingdom and the United States, among others. Apart from winning the 1981 Album of the Year award at the 24th Annual Grammy Awards, it was certified platinum by the British Phonographic Industry (BPI) and triple platinum by the Recording Industry Association of America (RIAA). Another album with Lennon, Milk and Honey, would be posthumously made available in 1984.

Ono released her fifth studio album Season of Glass in 1981, to moderate success in Norway, Sweden, the United Kingdom and the United States. The same year saw the single "Walking on Thin Ice" reaching number 58 on the US Billboard Hot 100; it marked Ono's first single to reach a major ranking and further peaked within the top 40 on the UK Singles Chart. Starting with 2001, the singer began re-releasing several remixes of her or Lennon's old material as singles, alongside new original songs. She has since then reached number one 13 times on Billboard's Dance Club Songs component chart, the last one being in 2017 with "Hell in Paradise 2016". In December 2016, Billboard named Ono the 11th most successful dance club artist of all time.

== Albums ==
=== Studio albums ===
List of studio albums, with selected chart positions and sales
Title	Album details	Peak chart positions					Sales
Title	Album details	AUS	NOR	SWE	UK	US	Sales
Yoko Ono/Plastic Ono Band	Released: 11 December 1970; Label: Apple; Format: LP, CS, CD	—	—	—	—	182	
Fly	Released: 20 September 1971; Label: Apple; Format: 2×LP, 2×CS, 2×CD	—	—	—	—	199	
Approximately Infinite Universe	Released: 8 January 1973; Label: Apple; Format: 2×LP, 2×CS, 2×CD	—	—	—	—	193	
Feeling the Space	Released: 23 November 1973; Label: Apple; Format: LP, CS, CD	—	—	—	—	—	
Season of Glass	Released: 8 June 1981; Label: Geffen; Format: LP, CS, CD	62	31	35	47	49	
It's Alright (I See Rainbows)	Released: 29 November 1982; Label: PolyGram; Format: LP, CS, CD	—	—	—	—	98	
Starpeace	Released: 19 November 1985; Label: PolyGram; Format: LP, CS, CD	—	—	—	—	—	
Rising	Released: November 1995; Label: Capitol; Format: CS, CD	—	—	—	—	—	US: 11,000
A Story	Released: July 1997; Label: Rykodisc; Format: CD	—	—	—	—	—	
Blueprint for a Sunrise	Released: 9 November 2001; Label: Capitol; Format: CS, CD	—	—	—	—	—	US: 3,000
Between My Head and the Sky	Released: 21 September 2009; Label: Chimera; Format: 2×LP, CD	—	—	—	—	—	
Take Me to the Land of Hell	Released: 17 September 2013; Label: Chimera; Format: 2×LP, CD, 2×CD	—	—	—	—	—	
Warzone	Released: 19 October 2018; Label: Chimera; Format: LP, CD	—	—	—	—	—	
Selected Recordings from Grapefruit	Released: 21 March 2025; Label: Karlrecords; Format: LP, CD	—	—	—	—	—	
"—" denotes a release that did not chart in that territory.

=== Collaborative albums ===
List of collaborative albums with John Lennon and other artists, with selected chart positions and certifications
Title	Album details	Peak chart positions										Sales
Title	Album details	JPN	AUS	CAN	GER	NLD	NOR	NZ	SWE	UK	US	Sales
Unfinished Music No. 1: Two Virgins (with John Lennon)	Released: 11 November 1968; Label: Apple, Track; Format: LP, CS, CD	190 (Note: 2017 reissue)	—	—	—	—	—	—	—	—	124	
Unfinished Music No. 2: Life with the Lions (with John Lennon)	Released: 9 May 1969; Label: Zapple; Format: LP, CS, CD	—	—	—	—	—	—	—	—	—	174	
Wedding Album (with John Lennon)	Released: 20 October 1969; Label: Apple; Format: LP, CS, CD	—	—	—	—	—	—	—	—	—	178	
Some Time in New York City (with John Lennon)	Released: 12 June 1972; Label: Apple; Format: 2×LP, 2×CS, 2×CD, CD	15	10	77	—	—	2	—	—	11	48	JPN: 20,000
Double Fantasy (with John Lennon)	Released: 17 November 1980; Label: Geffen; Format: LP, CS, CD	2	1	1	2	4	1	1	1 (Note: The 2010 reissue Double Fantasy Stripped Down peaked at number 47 in Sweden.)	1 (Note: The 2010 reissue Double Fantasy Stripped Down peaked at number 80 in the United Kingdom.)	1	JPN: 306,470; BPI: 300,000; BVMI: 250,000; RIAA: 3,000,000
Heart Play —unfinished dialogue— (with John Lennon)	Released: 16 December 1983; Label: Polydor; Format: LP, CS	50	—	—	—	—	—	—	—	—	94	JPN: 3,000
Milk and Honey (with John Lennon)	Released: 9 January 1984; Label: Polydor, Geffen; Format: LP, CS, CD	3	4	15	20	4	7	34	3	3	11	JPN: 106,000; BPI: 100,000; RIAA: 500,000
Yokokimthurston (with Kim Gordon and Thurston Moore)	Released: 25 September 2012; Label: Chimera; Format: 3×LP, CD	—	—	—	—	—	—	—	—	—	—	
"—" denotes a release that did not chart or was not released in that territory.

=== Other albums ===
==== Live albums ====
List of live albums, with selected chart positions and certifications
Title	Album details	Peak chart positions				Sales
Title	Album details	JPN	AUS	NOR	US	Sales
Live Peace in Toronto 1969 (with John Lennon)	Released: 12 December 1969; Label: Apple; Format: LP, CS, CD	78 (Note: 1995 reissue)	7	19	10	JPN: 5,000
Let's Have a Dream – 1974 One Step Festival	Released: 24 August 2022; Label: Super Fuji Discs; Formats: LP, CD	—	—	—	—	

==== Compilation albums ====
Title	Album details
The Many Sides of Yoko Ono	Released: June 1974; Label: Apple; Format: LP (Promo)
Onobox	Released: 1992; Label: Rykodisc; Format: 6×CD
Walking on Thin Ice	Released: 7 May 1992; Label: Rykodisc; Format: CD, CS
Power to the People (with John Lennon, Plastic Ono Band and Elephant's Memory)	Released: 10 October 2025; Label: Mercury; Format: 9×CD+3×Blu-Ray

==== Remix albums ====
Title	Album details	Peak chart positions
Title	Album details	US Dance/ Elec.
Rising Mixes	Released: 3 June 1996; Label: Capitol; Format: CD, LP (Promo)	—
Yes, I'm a Witch	Released: 6 February 2007; Label: Astralwerks, Apple; Format: CD	11
Open Your Box	Released: 24 April 2007; Label: Astralwerks; Format: CD	—
Onomix	Released: 18 September 2012; Label: Mind Train; Format: 2×CD (Promo)	—
Yes, I'm a Witch Too	Released: 19 February 2016; Label: Manimal Vinyl; Format: CD, 2×LP	—
"—" denotes a release that did not chart or was not released in that territory.

==== Soundtrack album ====
Title	Album details
New York Rock	Released: 4 May 1994; Label: Capitol

==== Tribute albums ====
Title	Album details
Every Man Has a Woman	Released: 1984; Label: PolyGram
Mrs. Lennon	Released: 2010; Label: Discobertas
Cut Pieces	Released: 13 January 2015; Label: Main Man
SuONO	Released: 8 February 2019; Label: Labellascheggia
Ocean Child: Songs of Yoko Ono	Released: 4 February 2022; Label: Atlantic

== Extended plays ==
Title	EP details
Song for John	Released: 1970; Note: Flexi-disc included with Aspen magazine no. 7.
A Blueprint for a Sunrise	Released: 2000; Note: Included with the book Yes Yoko Ono
Don't Stop Me!	Released: 9 June 2009; Label: Chimera
The Road of Hope	Released: 2011; Note: Included with the book The 8th Hiroshima Art Prize: The Road of Hope - Yoko Ono 2011
The Flaming Lips with Yoko Ono/Plastic Ono Band	Released: 31 December 2011; Label: Lovely Sorts of Death

== Singles ==
=== As lead artist ===
Key
‡	Indicates remixed re-release of (own) older single or album track

List of singles, with selected chart positions
Title	Year	Peak chart positions									Album
Title	Year	JPN	AUS	CAN	NZ	SWE	UK	US	US Dance/ Elec.	US Dance Club	Album
"Mrs. Lennon"/"Midsummer New York"	1971	—	—	—	—	—	—	—	—	—	Fly
"Mind Train"/"Listen, the Snow Is Falling"	1972	—	—	—	—	—	—	—	—	—	Fly
"Now or Never"/"Move on Fast"	1972	—	—	—	—	—	—	—	—	—	Approximately Infinite Universe
"Death of Samantha"/"Yang Yang"	1973	—	—	—	—	—	—	—	—	—	Approximately Infinite Universe
"Josejoi Banzai (Part 1)"/"Josejoi Banzai (Part 2)"	1973	72 (Note: 2020 reissue)	—	—	—	—	—	—	—	—	Non-album single
"Woman Power"/"Men, Men, Men"	1973	—	—	—	—	—	—	—	—	—	Feeling the Space
"Run, Run, Run"/"Men, Men, Men"	1973	—	—	—	—	—	—	—	—	—	Feeling the Space
"Yume O Motou (Let's Have a Dream)"/"It Happened"	1974	—	—	—	—	—	—	—	—	—	Non-album singles
"Walking on Thin Ice"/"It Happened"	1981	—	18	22	48	6	35	58	—	13	Non-album singles
"No, No, No"/"Will You Touch Me"	1981	—	—	—	—	—	—	—	—	—	Season of Glass
"Goodbye Sadness"/"I Don't Know Why"	1981	—	—	—	—	—	—	—	—	—	Season of Glass
"My Man"/"Let the Tears Dry"	1982	—	—	—	—	—	129	—	—	—	It's Alright (I See Rainbows)
"Never Say Goodbye"/"Loneliness"	1982	—	—	—	—	—	—	—	—	—	It's Alright (I See Rainbows)
"Hell in Paradise"	1985	—	—	—	—	—	—	—	—	12	Starpeace
"Cape Clear"/"Walking on Thin Ice"	1985	—	—	—	—	—	—	—	—	—	Starpeace
"Open Your Box"‡	2001	—	—	—	—	—	144	—	—	25	Non-album singles
"Kiss Kiss Kiss"‡	2002	—	—	—	—	—	—	—	—	20	Non-album singles
"Yang Yang"‡	2002	—	—	—	—	—	—	—	—	17	Non-album singles
"Walking on Thin Ice"‡	2003	—	—	—	—	—	35	—	—	1	Non-album singles
"Will I"/"Fly"‡	2003	—	—	—	—	—	—	—	—	—	Non-album singles
"Hell in Paradise"‡	2004	—	—	—	—	—	—	—	—	4	Non-album singles
"Everyman... Everywoman..."‡	2004	—	—	—	—	—	—	—	—	1	Non-album singles
"You're the One"‡	2007	—	—	—	—	—	—	—	—	2	Non-album singles
"No, No, No"‡	2007	—	—	—	—	—	—	—	—	1	Non-album singles
"Give Peace a Chance"‡	2008	—	—	—	—	—	—	—	—	1	Non-album singles
"I'm Not Getting Enough"‡	2009	—	—	—	—	—	—	—	—	1	Non-album singles
"Give Me Something"‡	2010	—	—	—	—	—	—	—	—	1	Non-album singles
"Wouldnit (I'm a Star)"‡	2010	—	—	—	—	—	—	—	—	1	Non-album singles
"Move on Fast"‡	2011	—	—	—	—	—	—	—	—	1	Non-album singles
"Talking to the Universe"‡	2011	—	—	—	—	—	—	—	—	1	Non-album singles
"She Gets Down On Her Knees"‡	2012	—	—	—	—	—	—	—	—	5	Non-album singles
"Early in the Morning"	2012	—	—	—	—	—	—	—	—	—	Yokokimthurston
"I'm Moving On"‡	2012	—	—	—	—	—	—	—	—	4	Non-album singles
"Hold Me" (featuring Dave Audé)	2013	—	—	—	—	—	—	—	19	1	Non-album singles
"Walking on Thin Ice 2013"‡	2013	—	—	—	—	—	—	—	23	1	Non-album singles
"Angel"	2014	—	—	—	—	—	—	—	22	1	Non-album singles
"Woman Power"‡	2015	—	—	—	—	—	—	—	39	6	Non-album singles
"I Love You, Earth"/"I'm Going Away Smiling" (with Antony and the Johnsons)	2015	—	—	—	—	—	—	—	—	—	Non-album singles
"Blink" (with John Zorn)	2015	—	—	—	—	—	—	—	—	—	Non-album singles
"Happy Xmas (War Is Over)"/"Atlas Eets Christmas" (with the Flaming Lips)	2015	—	—	—	—	—	—	—	—	—	Non-album singles
"Hell in Paradise 2016"‡	2016	—	—	—	—	—	—	—	29	1	Yes, I'm a Witch Too
"Listen, the Snow Is Falling" (Reissue)	2021	—	—	—	—	—	—	—	—	—	Non-album singles
"Who Has Seen the Wind?" (Reissue)	2022	—	—	—	—	—	—	—	—	—	Non-album singles
"No, No, No"/"Nobody Sees Me Like You Do" (Reissue)	2022	—	—	—	—	—	—	—	—	—	Season of Glass
"Yume O Motou" (Live)	2022	—	—	—	—	—	—	—	—	—	Let's Have a Dream – 1974 One Step Festival
"Move on Fast" (Live)	2022	—	—	—	—	—	—	—	—	—	Let's Have a Dream – 1974 One Step Festival
"—" denotes a release that did not chart or was not released in that territory.

=== Other appearances ===
List of B-side appearances on John Lennon singles
Title	Year	Main single
"Remember Love"	1969	"Give Peace a Chance"
"Don't Worry, Kyoko"	1969	"Cold Turkey"
"Who Has Seen the Wind?"	1970	"Instant Karma!"
"Why"	1971	"Mother"
"Open Your Box"	1971	"Power to the People" (Note: "Open Your Box" was the initial B-side to "Power to the People", but it was eventually replaced with "Touch Me" for later releases.)
"Touch Me"	1971	"Power to the People"
"Listen, the Snow is Falling"	1971	"Happy Xmas (War Is Over)"
"Sisters, O Sisters"	1972	"Woman Is the Nigger of the World"
"Kiss Kiss Kiss"	1980	"(Just Like) Starting Over"
"Beautiful Boys"	1981	"Woman"
"Yes, I'm Your Angel"	1981	"Watching the Wheels"
"O'Sanity"	1984	"Nobody Told Me"
"Your Hands"	1984	"Borrowed Time"
"Never Say Goodbye"	1984	"Borrowed Time" (12")
"Sleepless Night"	1984	"I'm Stepping Out"
"Loneliness"	1984	"I'm Stepping Out" (12")
"It's Alright"	1985	"Every Man Has a Woman Who Loves Him"

== Guest appearances ==
List of non-single album appearances, with other performing artists, showing year released and album name
Title	Year	Other performer(s)	Album
"The Continuing Story of Bungalow Bill"	1968	The Beatles	The Beatles
"Day of the Sunflowers (We March On)"	2009	Basement Jaxx	Scars
"The Fear Litany"	2011	The Flaming Lips	The Flaming Lips with Yoko Ono/Plastic Ono Band
"Do It!"	2011	The Flaming Lips	The Flaming Lips with Yoko Ono/Plastic Ono Band
"Brain of Heaven"	2011	The Flaming Lips	The Flaming Lips with Yoko Ono/Plastic Ono Band
"Atlas Eets Christmas"	2011	The Flaming Lips	The Flaming Lips with Yoko Ono/Plastic Ono Band
"I'm Ready to Move On / Wild Heart Reprise"	2014	Bleachers	Strange Desire
"Utopia"	2014	Chicks on Speed	Artstravaganza
"In Love with Life"	2016	Hifi Sean	Ft.
"This Cities Undone"	2017	The Moonlandingz	Interplanetary Class Classics
"Occidental Front"	2017	Black Lips	Satan's Graffiti or God's Art?

== Songwriting contributions ==
List of songwriting contributions, with lead artists, showing year released and album name
Song	Year	Artist(s)	Album	Notes	Ref
"3 Tearz"	2019	Danny Brown featuring Run the Jewels	U Know What I'm Sayin?	Contains elements from "Why" from Yoko Ono/Plastic Ono Band.	
"Bonds"	2015	Daye Jack	Soul Glitch	Samples "I Have a Woman Inside My Soul" from Approximately Infinite Universe.	
"Do the Oz"	1971	Elastic Oz Band	John Lennon/Plastic Ono Band (2000 Reissue)	B-Side of "God Save Us".	
"Fim Da Linha"	2014	Easy B	-	-	
"God Save Us"	1971	Elastic Oz Band	-	-	
"Gold Rush"	2018	Death Cab for Cutie	Thank You for Today	Samples "Mind Train" from Fly.	
"I'm Ready to Move On / Wild Heart Reprise"	2014	Bleachers	Strange Desire	-	
"Imagine"	1971	John Lennon	Imagine	Received songwriting credit in 2017.	
"Look at the Sky"	2015	Olly Murs	Never Been Better (Japan Version)	Cover of "Sukiyaki" with English lyrics written by Ono.	
"Oh My Love"	1971	John Lennon	Imagine	-	
"This Cities Undone"	2017	The Moonlandingz	Interplanetary Class Classics	-	
"Woman is the Nigger of the World"	1972	John Lennon	Some Time in New York City	-	

== Music videos ==
- "Mrs. Lennon" (1971)
- "Mind Train" (1972)
- "Don't Count the Waves" (1972)
- "Midsummer New York" (1972)
- "Walking on Thin Ice" (1981)
- "No, No, No" (1981)
- "Goodbye Sadness" (1981)
- "My Man" (1982)
- "Hell in Paradise" (1985)
- "New York Woman" (1996)
- "Bad Dancer" (2013)
