= List of songs recorded by Yoko Ono =

Songs by Yoko Ono

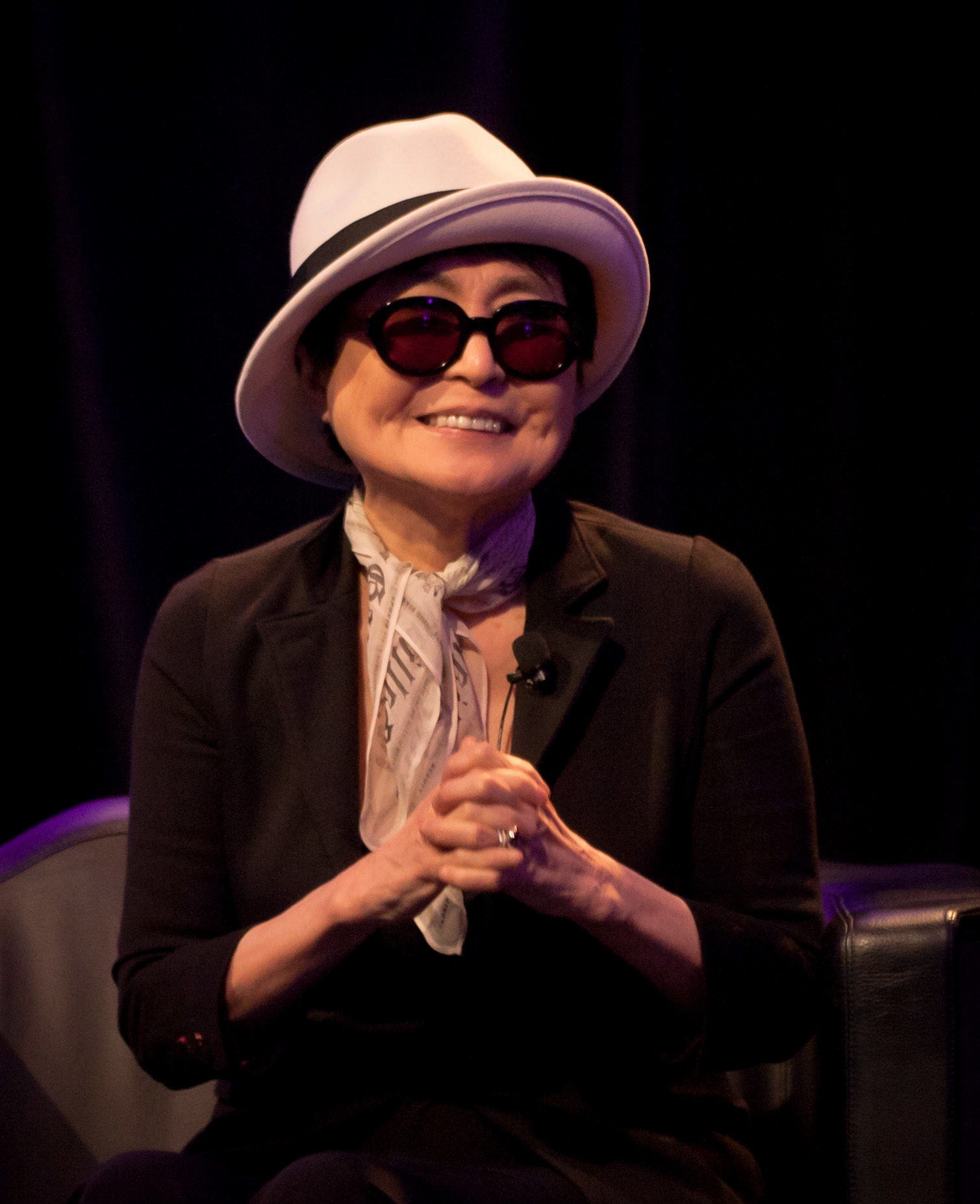
Yoko Ono in an interview at SXSW in Austin, Texas in 2011.

This is a list of songs recorded by Yoko Ono, sorted alphabetically and listing the year of each song's first official release and the album(s) and/or single(s) they were included on.

== Songs ==
Key
•	Indicates song is sung in Japanese or contains Japanese lyrics

Title	Year	Album/Single	Notes	Ref(s).
"7th Floor"	2013	Take Me to the Land of Hell	-	
"Ai"	2013	Take Me to the Land of Hell (Japanese Edition)	Recorded in 2001.	
"Airmale" •	1971	Fly	Soundtrack to John Lennon's film Erection.	
"Air Talk"	1973	Approximately Infinite Universe	Title and lyrics taken from Grapefruit.	
"Amerika" (with David Peel & The Super Apple Band)	1980	John Lennon For President	Released as a single in 1989.	
"Amsterdam"	1969	Wedding Album	-	
"Angela"	1972	Some Time in New York City	-	
"Angry Young Woman"	1973	Feeling the Space	-	
"AOS"	1970	Yoko Ono/Plastic Ono Band	Recorded 28 February 1968 with Ornette Coleman.	
"Approximately Infinite Universe"	1973	Approximately Infinite Universe	-	
"Are You Looking for Me?"	2000	A Blueprint for a Sunrise (From Yes, Yoko Ono Book)	An alternate version later appeared on Blueprint for a Sunrise. Samples "The Path" and "Greenfield Morning".	
"Ask the Dragon"	1995	Rising	-	
"Ask the Elephant!"	2009	Don't Stop Me!	Remake of "Ask the Dragon" with new lyrics. Later included on Between My Head and the Sky.	
"Atlas Eets Christmas" (with The Flaming Lips)	2011	The Flaming Lips with Yoko Ono/Plastic Ono Band	-	
"Attica State"	1972	Some Time in New York City	-	
"Au"	1972	Some Time in New York City	-	
"Baby's Heartbeat"	1969	Unfinished Music No.2: Life with the Lions	Recording of the heartbeat of unborn John Ono Lennon II.	
"Bad Dancer"	2013	Take Me to the Land of Hell	-	
"Beautiful Boys"	1980	Double Fantasy	B-Side of "Woman". Demo version included on CD reissue of It's Alright.	
"Between My Head and the Sky"	2009	Between My Head and the Sky	-	
"Between the Takes"	1997	Fly (CD Reissue)	Outtake from Yoko Ono/Plastic Ono Band, unreleased until 1997.	
"Blink" (with John Zorn)	2015	Standalone Single	Recorded live on Spinning on Air, WNYC, 11 November 2012.	
"Born in a Prison"	1972	Some Time in New York City	-	
"Brain of Heaven" (with The Flaming Lips)	2011	The Flaming Lips with Yoko Ono/Plastic Ono Band	-	
"Calling" •	2009	Don't Stop Me!	An alternate version was later included on Between My Head and the Sky.	
"Cambridge 1969"	1969	Unfinished Music No.2: Life with the Lions	Live Performance recorded on 2 March 1969 at Cambridge University.	
"Cape Clear"	1985	Starpeace	Released as the album's second single in 1986. Re-recorded as "Teddy Bear" in 2018 for Warzone.	
"Cheshire Cat Cry"	2013	Take Me to the Land of Hell	-	
"Children Power"	1985	Starpeace	-	
"Coffin Car"	1973	Feeling the Space	Title taken from "Riding Piece" from Grapefruit.	
"Day of the Sunflowers (We March On)" (Basement Jaxx featuring Yoko Ono)	2009	Scars	-	
"Death of Samantha"	1973	Approximately Infinite Universe	Released as the album's second single in 1973.	
"Do It!" (with The Flaming Lips)	2011	The Flaming Lips with Yoko Ono/Plastic Ono Band	-	
"Don't Be Scared"	1984	Milk and Honey	An extended version appeared on Onobox.	
"Don't Count the Waves"	1971	Fly	-	
"Don't Frack My Mother" (Sean Lennon, Yoko Ono and Artists Against Fracking)	2013	-	-	
"Don't Worry Kyoko (Mummy's Only Looking for Her Hand in the Snow)"	1969	"Cold Turkey"	Later included on Fly. Live versions were released on Live Peace Toronto 1969 and Some Time in New York City. Both the original version and the previously unreleased full Jam session were included on the 2021 John Lennon/Plastic Ono Band Ultimate Collection box set.	
"Dogtown"	1981	Season of Glass (1981) Onobox (1992) A Story (Recorded 1974, Released 1997)	First released in 1981 on Season of Glass. Another version had been previously recorded in 1974 for the shelved album A Story, this version was not released until 1992 through Onobox. An even earlier demo version from 1972 was included on CD reissues of Approximately Infinite Universe.	
"Dream Love"	1982	It's Alright (I See Rainbows)	-	
"Early in the Morning" (with Kim Gordon and Thurston Moore)	2012	Yokokimthurston	Released as a 12" single, limited to 1000 copies.	
"Extension 33"	1981	Season of Glass	A demo version was included as a bonus track on A Story.	
"Even When You're Far Away"	1981	Season of Glass	Includes spoken word section "A Little Story" by Sean Ono Lennon.	
"Every Man Has a Woman Who Loves Him"	1980	Double Fantasy	-	
"The Fear Litany" (with The Flaming Lips)	2011	The Flaming Lips with Yoko Ono/Plastic Ono Band	-	
"Feel the Sand"	2009	Don't Stop Me!	Later included on Between My Head and the Sky.	
"Fly"	1971	Fly	Soundtrack to Yoko Ono's film Fly.	
"Forgive Me, My Love"	1992	Onobox	Recorded in 1982 for the It's Alright album.	
"Franklin Summer"	1996	Rising Mixes	-	
"Georgia Stone"	1993	A Chance Operation - A John Cage Tribute	Samples "Let the Tears Dry" and "Dream Love". Includes archival spoken word sections by John Lennon and Martin Luther King Jr.	
"Give Me Something"	1980	Double Fantasy	-	
"Goodbye, My Love"	1995	Rising	-	
"Goodbye Sadness"	1981	Season of Glass	Released as the album's second single in 1981.	
"Greenfield Morning I Pushed an Empty Baby Carriage All Over the City"	1970	Yoko Ono/Plastic Ono Band	Title taken from "City Piece" from Grapefruit. The full jam session was released for the first time on the 2021 John Lennon/Plastic Ono Band Ultimate Collection box set.	
"Growing Pain"	1973	Feeling the Space	-	
"Hanako" •	2009	Between My Head and the Sky (Japanese Edition)	-	
"Happy Xmas (War is Over)"	1971	Standalone Single	Later included on 2005 reissue of Some Time in New York City.	
"Hard Times are Over"	1980	Double Fantasy (1980) A Story (Recorded 1974, Released 1997)	Originally recorded for the shelved album A Story, later re-recorded in 1980 for Double Fantasy. The 1974 version was not officially released until 1997.	
"Hashire, Hashire" •	2009	Between My Head and the Sky	-	
"Have You Seen a Horizon Lately?"	1973	Approximately Infinite Universe	Title taken from Grapefruit.	
"Hawk's Call"	2013	Take Me to the Land of Hell	14 seconds of silence.	
"Healing"	2009	Between My Head and the Sky	-	
"Heartbeat"	2001	Mutations: Sonic City	Created for Sonic City installation at TN Probe, Tokyo from 10 November 2001 to 26 January 2002.	
"Heartburn Stew"	1992	Onobox (1992) A Story (Recorded 1974, Released 1997)	Recorded for the shelved album A Story.	
"Hell in Paradise"	1985	Starpeace	Released as the album's first single in 1985. Re-recorded in 2018 for Warzone.	
"Higa Noboru" •	2009	Between My Head and the Sky	-	
"Hiroshima Sky is Always Blue" (with Paul McCartney)	1995		-	
"Hold Me"	2013	Standalone Single	-	
"I Don't Know Why"	1981	Season of Glass	B-Side of "Goodbye Sadness". A demo recorded on 9 December 1980 was included on CD copies of Season of Glass.	
"I Felt Like Smashing My Face in a Clear Glass Window"	1973	Approximately Infinite Universe	-	
"I Have a Woman Inside My Soul"	1973	Approximately Infinite Universe	-	
"I Lost Myself Somewhere In The Sky"	2021	John Lennon/Plastic Ono Band (Ultimate Collection)	Outtake from Yoko Ono/Plastic Ono Band. First released in 2021 as part of the John Lennon/Plastic Ono Band Ultimate Collection Box Set.	
"I Love All of Me"	1985	Starpeace	Re-recorded in 2018 for Warzone.	
"I Love You, Earth"	1985	Starpeace	Re-recorded in 2018 for Warzone.	
"I Missed You Listening" (with Kim Gordon and Thurston Moore)	2012	Yokokimthurston	-	
"I Never Told You, Did I?" (with Kim Gordon and Thurston Moore)	2012	Yokokimthurston	-	
"I Remember Everything"	2001	Blueprint for a Sunrise	Written for the play Hiroshima (1997).	
"I See Rainbows"	1982	It's Alright (I See Rainbows)	-	
"I Want My Love to Rest Tonight"	1973	Approximately Infinite Universe	-	
"I Want You to Remember Me 'A'"	2001	Blueprint for a Sunrise	-	
"I Want You to Remember Me 'B'"	2001	Blueprint for a Sunrise	-	
"If Only"	1973	Feeling the Space	-	
"I'm Alive"	2009	Between My Head and the Sky	Re-recorded in 2018 for Warzone.	
"I'm Dying"	1995	Rising	-	
"I'm Going Away Smiling"	2009	Between My Head and the Sky	-	
"I'm Moving On"	1980	Double Fantasy	Demo version included on 2001 reissue of Milk and Honey.	
"I'm Not Getting Enough"	2001	Blueprint for a Sunrise	-	
"I'm Ready to Move On / Wild Heart Reprise"	2014	Strange Desire	Song by the Bleachers.	
"Imagine"	2018	Warzone	Cover of song by John Lennon. A live version recorded in 1986 on the Starpeace world tour had previously been released on the 1997 CD reissue of Starpeace.	
"In Love with Life"	2016	Ft.	Song by Hifi Sean.	
"Is This What We Do"	2001	Blueprint for a Sunrise	-	
"Is Winter Here to Stay?"	1973	Approximately Infinite Universe	Title taken from Grapefruit.	
"It Happened"	1974	"Yume O Motou"	Planned to be included on the 1974 shelved album A Story, which was not released in full until 1997. A remixed version was released as the b-side of "Walking on Thin Ice" in 1981.	
"It's Alright"	1982	It's Alright (I See Rainbows)	-	
"It's Been Very Hard"	1992	Onobox	Recorded in 1973 for Feeling the Space but did not make the final tracklist. First released in 1992 on Onobox and later included on 2017 reissue of Feeling the Space.	
"It's Gonna Rain (Living on Tiptoe)"	1985	Starpeace	Re-recorded in 2018 for Warzone.	
"It's Time for Action!" •	2000	A Blueprint for a Sunrise (From Yes, Yoko Ono Book)	An alternate version later appeared on Blueprint for a Sunrise. The 2001 version samples "You" and features vocals from 13 other women speaking different languages. The languages spoken are English (by Yoko), Ethiopian, Hungarian, Russian, Hebrew, Punjabi, Arabic, French, Turkish, Chinese, Korean, German, Portuguese, Japanese, Italian and Persian.	
"John and Yoko"	1969	Wedding Album	-	
"John John (Let's Hope for Peace)"	1969	Live Peace in Toronto 1969	-	
"Joseijoi Banzai" •	1973	Standalone Single (Only released in Japan)	Later included on Onobox and Japanese Editions of Blueprint for a Sunrise.	
"The King of the Zoo"	1985	Starpeace	-	
"Kiss Kiss Kiss" •	1980	Double Fantasy	B-Side of "(Just Like) Starting Over".	
"Kite Song"	1973	Approximately Infinite Universe	-	
"Kurushi" •	1995	Rising	-	
"Leaving Tim"	2013	Take Me to the Land of Hell	-	
"Left Turn's the Right Turn"	1992	Onobox	Recorded in 1973 for Feeling the Space but did not make the final tracklist. First released in 1992 on Onobox and later included on 2017 reissue of Feeling the Space.	
"Let Me Count the Ways"	1984	Milk and Honey	An extended version appeared on Onobox.	
"Let's Get There" (with Kim Gordon and Thurston Moore)	2012	Yokokimthurston	-	
"Let's Go On Flying"	1970	Aspen No.7 - British Box	Recorded in 1968. Acappella demo version of "Song for John".	
"Let the Tears Dry"	1982	It's Alright (I See Rainbows)	B-Side of "My Man".	
"Life"	2021	John Lennon/Plastic Ono Band (Ultimate Collection)	Outtake from Yoko Ono/Plastic Ono Band. First released in 2021 as part of the John Lennon/Plastic Ono Band Ultimate Collection Box Set.	
"Listen, the Snow Is Falling"	1971	"Happy Xmas (War is Over)"	Later released as b-side of "Mind Train" and included on the 1997 reissue of Wedding Album as well as the 2005 reissue of Some Time in New York City. Lyrics taken from "Snow Piece" from Grapefruit.	
"Little Boy Blue (Your Daddy's Gone)"	2013	Take Me to the Land of Hell	-	
"Loneliness"	1982	It's Alright (I See Rainbows) Onobox (1992) A Story (Recorded 1974, Released 1997)	First released in 1982 on the album It's Alright and as the b-side of "Never Say Goodbye". An earlier version from 1974 was planned to be included on the shelved album A Story and was not released until 1992 through the Onobox compilation.	
"Looking Over from My Hotel Window"	1973	Approximately Infinite Universe	Also known as "Age 39" on some releases.	
"The Luck of the Irish"	1972	Some Time in New York City	-	
"Memory of Footsteps"	2009	Between My Head and the Sky	-	
"Men, Men, Men"	1973	Feeling the Space	B-Side of "Woman Power" and "Run, Run, Run".	
"Midsummer New York"	1971	Fly	B-Side of "Mrs. Lennon". An alternate take from the Fly sessions was released in 2018 on the Japanese Edition of Warzone	
"Mildred, Mildred"	1992	Onobox	Recorded in 1973 for Feeling the Space but did not make the final tracklist. First released in 1992 on Onobox and later included on 2017 reissue of Feeling the Space. A demo version was also included on all CD reissues of Feeling the Space.	
"Mind Holes"	1971	Fly	-	
"Mind Train"	1971	Fly	Released as the album's second single in 1972.	
"Mindweaver"	1981	Season of Glass	-	
"Mirror, Mirror" (with Kim Gordon and Thurston Moore)	2012	Yokokimthurston	-	
"Move on Fast"	1973	Approximately Infinite Universe	B-Side of "Now or Never".	
"Moving Mountains"	2009	Between My Head and the Sky	-	
"Mother of the Universe"	1981	Season of Glass	-	
"Mrs. Lennon"	1971	Fly	Released as the album's first single in 1971.	
"Mulberry"	1997	Unfinished Music No.2: Life with the Lions (CD Reissue)	Recorded in 1968. A live version from 2001 was included on Blueprint for a Sunrise.	
"Mum's Only Looking for Her Hand in the Snow"	1970	Aspen No.7 - British Box	Demo version of "Don't Worry Kyoko"; Included on a flexidisc released through Aspen magazine and later included on 1997 CD reissue of "Wedding Album".	
"My Man"	1982	It's Alright (I See Rainbows)	Released as the album's first single in 1982.	
"Namyohorengekyo" •	1992	Onobox	Recorded in 1974 for A Story.	
"Never Say Goodbye"	1982	It's Alright (I See Rainbows)	Released as the album's second single in 1983.	
"New York Woman"	1995	Rising	-	
"A Night in Warsaw"	2008	Tribute to Gustav Metzger	Spoken word. Uses lyrics from "Hell in Paradise".	
"No Bed for Beatle John"	1969	Unfinished Music No.2: Life with the Lions	-	
"Nobody Sees Me Like You Do"	1981	Season of Glass	Initially recorded during the Double Fantasy sessions.	
"No, No, No"	1981	Season of Glass	Released as the album's first single in 1981.	
"Now or Never"	1973	Approximately Infinite Universe	Released as the album's first single in 1972. Re-recorded in 2018 for Warzone.	
"N.Y. Noodle Town"	2013	Take Me to the Land of Hell	-	
"Occidental Front"	2017	Satan's Graffiti or God's Art?	Song by the Black Lips.	
"Ode to Meadow"	2016	Home on the Range (A Farm Animal Sanctuary Benefit)	English version of "Hanako".	
"Omae No Okaa Wa" •	2021	John Lennon/Plastic Ono Band (Ultimate Collection)	Outtake from Yoko Ono/Plastic Ono Band. Contains lyrical references to John Lennon's "My Mummy's Dead". First released in 2021 as part of the John Lennon/Plastic Ono Band Ultimate Collection Box Set.	
"One Way Road" •	2022	Let's Have a Dream - 1974 One Step Festival	Performed live in 1974 but was not released commercially until 2022 on the Let's Have a Dream live album.	
"Open Your Box"	1970	"Power to the People"	Later appeared on Fly in 1971 under the title of "Hirake". An alternate version was released in 1997 on the Yoko Ono/Plastic Ono Band CD reissue.	
"Open Your Soul to Me"	1992	Onobox	Recorded in 1981 for Season of Glass.	
"O'Oh"	1992	Onobox	Recorded in 1974 for A Story.	
"O'Sanity"	1984	Milk and Honey	-	
"O'Wind (Body is the Scar of Your Mind)"	1971	Fly	-	
"Paper Shoes"	1970	Yoko Ono/Plastic Ono Band	The full jam session was released for the first time on the 2021 John Lennon/Plastic Ono Band Ultimate Collection box set.	
"The Path"	1992	Onobox	Recorded in 1970. First released on Onobox in 1992 and later included on Fly 2017 reissue.	
"The Paths"	2000	A Blueprint for a Sunrise (From Yes, Yoko Ono Book)	Samples the tracks "Coffin Car", "You", "Airmale", "O'Wind" and "Fly".	
"Peter the Dealer"	1973	Approximately Infinite Universe	-	
"Potbelly Rocker"	1992	Onobox	Recorded in 1973 for Feeling the Space but did not make the final tracklist. First released in 1992 on Onobox and later included on 2017 reissue of Feeling the Space.	
"Radio Play"	1969	Unfinished Music No.2: Life with the Lions	-	
"Rainbow Revelation"	1985	Starpeace (1985) Rising (1995) (re-recorded and titled "Revelations")	Vocals of 1995 version used for 2007's Yes, I'm a Witch remix album with vocals from Cat Power.	
"Remember Love"	1969	"Give Peace a Chance"	Later included on CD reissues of Unfinished Music No.1: Two Virgins and the 2021 John Lennon/Plastic Ono Band Ultimate Collection box set.	
"Remember Raven"	1985	Starpeace	-	
"Rising"	1995	Rising	-	
"Rising II"	2001	Blueprint for a Sunrise	-	
"Run, Run, Run"	1973	Feeling the Space	Released as a single in Europe in 1973.	
"Running the Risk" (with Kim Gordon and Thurston Moore)	2012	Yokokimthurston	-	
"Scream"	2011	The Road to Hope	-	
"She Hits Back"	1973	Feeling the Space	-	
"She Gets Down on Her Knees"	1981	Season of Glass (1981) A Story (Recorded 1974, Released 1997)	First released in 1981 on Season of Glass. Another version had been previously recorded in 1974 for the shelved album A Story which was not released until 1997. A demo version from 1974 was included on the 1997 CD reissue of Approximately Infinite Universe.	
"Shine, Shine"	2013	Take Me to the Land of Hell	-	
"Shiranakatta (I Didn't Know)" •	1973	Approximately Infinite Universe	-	
"Silver Horse"	1981	Season of Glass	-	
"Sisters, O Sisters"	1972	Some Time in New York City	B-side of "Woman is the Nigger of the World".	
"Sky People"	1985	Starpeace	-	
"Sleepless Night"	1984	Milk and Honey	An extended version appeared on Onobox.	
"Snow is Falling All the Time"	1970	Aspen No.7 - British Box	Demo version of "Listen, the Snow Is Falling".	
"Something More Abstract"	1997	Yoko Ono/Plastic Ono Band (CD Reissue)	Outtake from Yoko Ono/Plastic Ono Band sessions, unreleased until 1997.	
"Song for John"	1973	Approximately Infinite Universe	Demo version from 1968 included on CD copies of Unfinished Music No.2: Life with the Lions.	
"Soul Got Out of the Box"	2001	Blueprint for a Sunrise	Originally recorded for Approximately Infinite Universe.	
"The Source"	1996	Rising Mixes	Contains samples and elements from "Don't Worry Kyoko", "Mind Train", "Fly", "Greenfield Morning", "O'Oh", "O'Wind", "Why" and "Why Not".	
"The South Wind"	1997	Yoko Ono/Plastic Ono Band (CD Reissue)	Alternate recording of "Fly", unreleased until 1997.	
"Spec of Dust"	1982	It's Alright (I See Rainbows)	-	
"Starpeace"	1985	Starpeace	-	
"A Story"	1992	Onobox (1992) A Story (Recorded 1974, Released 1997)	Recorded for the shelved album A Story.	
"Story of an Oak Tree"	2013	Take Me to the Land of Hell (Japanese Edition)	Originally written for the New York Rock musical in 1994.	
"Straight Talk"	1973	Feeling the Space	-	
"The Sun is Down!"	2009	Don't Stop Me! EP	Later included on Between My Head and the Sky.	
"Sunday Bloody Sunday"	1972	Some Time in New York City	-	
"Tabetai" •	2013	Take Me to the Land of Hell	Yoko performed this song as far back as the 1970s, long before its first appearance on a studio album.	
"Take Me to the Land of Hell"	2013	Take Me to the Land of Hell	-	
"Talking to the Universe"	1995	Rising	-	
"Telephone Piece"	1971	Fly	3 different versions recorded for U.S., U.K. and Japanese Pressings.	
"There's No Goodbye Between Us"	2013	Take Me to the Land of Hell	A demo version from 1981 for the Season of Glass album was released in 1992 on the Onobox set.	
"This Cities Undone"	2017	Interplanetary Class Classics	Song by The Moonlandingz.	
"A Thousand Times Yes"	1973	Feeling the Space	-	
"Toilet Piece/Unknown"	1971	Fly	-	
"Tomorrow May Never Come"	1982	It's Alright (I See Rainbows) (1982) Onobox (1992) A Story (Recorded 1974, Released 1997)	First released in 1982 on It's Alright. An earlier version from 1974 recorded for the shelved A Story album was first released in 1992 on Onobox.	
"Touch Me"	1970	Yoko Ono/Plastic Ono Band	B-Side of "Power to the People" in the United States. The full jam session was released for the first time on the 2021 John Lennon/Plastic Ono Band Ultimate Collection box set.	
"Toyboat"	1981	Season of Glass	-	
"Turn of the Wheel"	1981	Season of Glass	-	
"Turned the Corner"	1995	Rising	-	
"Two Minutes Silence"	1969	Unfinished Music No.2: Life with the Lions	2 minutes of silence.	
"Two Virgins: Side One"	1968	Unfinished Music No.1: Two Virgins	-	
"Two Virgins: Side Two"	1968	Unfinished Music No.1: Two Virgins	-	
"Unun. To" •	2009	Between My Head and the Sky	-	
"Utopia"	2014	Artstravaganza	Song by Chicks On Speed.	
"Waiting for the Sunrise"	1973	Approximately Infinite Universe	-	
"Waiting for the D Train"	2009	Between My Head and the Sky	-	
"Wake Up"	1982	It's Alright (I See Rainbows)	-	
"Walking on Thin Ice"	1981	Standalone Single	Later included on CD copies of Season of Glass and the 2000 reissue of Double Fantasy.	
"Warrior Woman"	1992	Onobox	Recorded in 1973 for Feeling the Space but did not make the final tracklist. First released in 1992 on Onobox and later included on 2017 reissue of Feeling the Space.	
"Warzone"	1995	Rising	Originally written for the 1994 New York Rock musical. Re-recorded in 2018 for Warzone.	
"Watching the Dawn"	2013	Take Me to the Land of Hell	-	
"Watching the Rain"	2009	Between My Head and the Sky	-	
"We Are Dying"	2010	Sing for China (Fight AIDS with Art)	-	
"We're All Water"	1972	Some Time in New York City	Title taken from "Water Piece" from Grapefruit.	
"What a Bastard the World Is"	1973	Approximately Infinite Universe	-	
"What a Mess"	1973	Approximately Infinite Universe	-	
"What Did I Do!"	1973	Approximately Infinite Universe	-	
"Where Do We Go from Here"	1995	Rising	Originally written for the 1994 New York Rock musical. Re-recorded in 2018 for Warzone.	
"Who Has Seen the Wind?"	1970	"Instant Karma!"	Later included on the 1997 CD reissue of Wedding Album and the 2021 John Lennon/Plastic Ono Band Ultimate Collection box set.	
"Whole Lotta Yoko"	1996	The Rolling Stones Rock and Roll Circus	Recorded in 1968. Performed with The Dirty Mac and Ivry Gitlis.	
"Why"	1970	Yoko Ono/Plastic Ono Band	B-Side of "Mother". A previously unreleased extended version was included on the 2016 reissue of Yoko Ono/Plastic Ono Band. Re-recorded in 2018 for Warzone. The original full jam session from 1970 was released for the first time on the 2021 John Lennon/Plastic Ono Band Ultimate Collection box set.	
"Why Not"	1970	Yoko Ono/Plastic Ono Band	The full jam session was released for the first time on the 2021 John Lennon/Plastic Ono Band Ultimate Collection box set.	
"Will I"	1995	Rising	-	
"Will You Touch Me"	1981	Season of Glass (1981) Onobox (1992) A Story (Recorded 1974, Released 1997)	First released in 1981 on Season of Glass and as the b-side of "No, No, No". Another version had been previously recorded in 1974 for the shelved album A Story, this version was not released until 1992 through Onobox. An even earlier demo version from 1971 was included on CD reissues of Fly.	
"Winter Friend"	1992	Onobox (1992) A Story (Recorded 1974, Released 1997)	Recorded for the shelved album A Story.	
"Winter Song"	1973	Approximately Infinite Universe	-	
"Woman of Salem"	1973	Feeling the Space	-	
"Woman Power"	1973	Feeling the Space	Released as single in North America in 1973. Re-recorded in 2018 for Warzone.	
"Wouldnit"	1995	Rising	-	
"Wouldnit 'swing'"	2001	Blueprint for a Sunrise	Remix of "Wouldnit".	
"Yang Yang"	1973	Approximately Infinite Universe	B-Side of "Death of Samantha".	
"Yellow Girl (Stand by for Life)"	1973	Feeling the Space	-	
"Yes, I'm a Witch"	1992	Onobox (1992) A Story (Recorded 1974, Released 1997)	Recorded for the shelved album A Story.	
"Yes, I'm Your Angel"	1980	Double Fantasy	B-Side of "Watching the Wheels" (U.K.).	
"You"	1971	Fly	-	
"You and I"	1985	Starpeace	-	
"Your Hands" •	1984	Milk and Honey	Demo version included as a bonus track on A Story as "Anatano Te/Your Hands"	
"You're the One"	1984	Milk and Honey	An extended version appeared on Onobox. An alternate take was included on CD copies of It's Alright.	
"Yume O Motou (Let's Have a Dream)" •	1974	Standalone Single (Only released in Japan)	Later included on Onobox and Japanese Editions of Blueprint for a Sunrise in remixed form	

== Unreleased songs ==
Song	Notes	Ref.
"I Know"	With Kim Gordon and Thurston Moore	
"My Love for You"	-	
"Power of Truth"	-	
"Rainbow Time"	Performed in the 1984 documentary Yoko Ono: Now & Then.	
"See You"	With Kim Gordon and Thurston Moore	
"Thurstono"	With Kim Gordon and Thurston Moore	

== See also ==
- Yoko Ono discography
