= List of Plastic Ono Band line-ups =

This is a list of the line-ups of the Plastic Ono Band, the backing band established by John Lennon and Yoko Ono. It was active in various incarnations from 1969 to 1974, and was revived by Ono from 2009 until 2015. The group had a constantly shifting line-up, so this page reflects each individual incarnation under the name.

== Members ==
=== Original era ===
Image	Name	Years active	Instruments	Release contributions
	John Lennon	1969–1974	vocals; rhythm guitar; keyboards	all releases
	Yoko Ono	1969–1974	vocals; keyboards; percussion	all releases
	Tom Smothers	June 1969	acoustic guitar; backing vocals	"Give Peace a Chance" (1969)
	Timothy Leary	June 1969	backing vocals; handclaps	"Give Peace a Chance" (1969)
	Rabbi Abraham Feinberg	June 1969	backing vocals; handclaps	"Give Peace a Chance" (1969)
	Joseph Schwartz	June 1969	backing vocals; handclaps	"Give Peace a Chance" (1969)
	Rosemary Woodruff Leary	June 1969	backing vocals; handclaps	"Give Peace a Chance" (1969)
	Petula Clark	June 1969	backing vocals; handclaps	"Give Peace a Chance" (1969)
	Dick Gregory	June 1969	backing vocals; handclaps	"Give Peace a Chance" (1969)
	Allen Ginsberg	June 1969	backing vocals; handclaps	"Give Peace a Chance" (1969)
	Murray the K	June 1969	backing vocals; handclaps	"Give Peace a Chance" (1969)
	Derek Taylor	June 1969	backing vocals; handclaps	"Give Peace a Chance" (1969)
	Eric Clapton ("Derek Claptoe")	September 1969–December 1969	lead guitar; backing vocals	Live Peace in Toronto 1969 (1969); "Cold Turkey"/"Don't Worry Kyoko" (1969); Some Time in New York City (1972)
	Klaus Voormann ("Raus Doorman")	September 1969–January 1970; September 1970–August 1971; 1974	bass; electric piano; backing vocals; guitar; percussion	Live Peace in Toronto 1969 (1969); "Cold Turkey"/"Don't Worry Kyoko" (1969); Some Time in New York City (1972); "Instant Karma!" (1970); John Lennon/Plastic Ono Band (1970); Yoko Ono/Plastic Ono Band (1970); "Open Your Box" (1971); "Power to the People" (1971); Fly (1971); "Listen, the Snow Is Falling" (1971); Walls and Bridges (1974)
	Alan White ("Dallas White")	September 1969; December 1969; February, May–July 1971	drums; percussion; piano; backing vocals	Live Peace in Toronto 1969 (1969); "Instant Karma!" (1970); Imagine (1971); Some Time in New York City (1972)
	Ringo Starr	September 1969; September–November 1970	drums	"Cold Turkey"/"Don't Worry Kyoko" (1969); John Lennon/Plastic Ono Band (1970); Yoko Ono/Plastic Ono Band (1970)
	George Harrison ("George Harrisong")	December 1969–January 1970; October–November 1970; February, May–July 1971	guitar; piano; sitar; dobro; backing vocals	"Instant Karma!" (1970); Yoko Ono/Plastic Ono Band (1970); Some Time in New York City (1972); Imagine (1971)
	Billy Preston ("Billy Presstud")	December 1969–January 1970; September–October 1970; January–February 1971	organ; piano; keyboards; backing vocals	"Instant Karma!" (1970); John Lennon/Plastic Ono Band (1970); "Power to the People" (1971); Some Time in New York City (1972)
	Jim Gordon ("Jim Bordom")	December 1969; January–August 1971,	drums; tabla	Some Time in New York City (1972); "Open Your Box" (1971); "Power to the People" (1971); Imagine (1971); Fly (1971)
	Bobby Keys ("Robbie Knees")	December 1969; January–February 1971; August 1971; 1974	saxophone; percussion	Some Time in New York City (1972); "Power to the People" (1971); Fly (1971); Walls and Bridges (1974)
	Nicky Hopkins ("Sticky Topkins")	December 1969; February, May–October 1971; 1974	electric piano; piano; keyboards	Imagine (1971); Some Time in New York City (1972); "Happy Xmas (War Is Over)" (1971); "Listen, the Snow Is Falling" (1971); Walls and Bridges (1974)
	Keith Moon ("Kief Spoon")	December 1969	drums	Some Time in New York City (1972)
	Delaney Bramlett ("Bilanie")	December 1969	guitar	Some Time in New York City (1972)
	Bonnie Bramlett ("Donnie")	December 1969	percussion	Some Time in New York City (1972)
	Jim Price	December 1969	trumpet	Some Time in New York City (1972)
	Mal Evans	January 1970	chimes; handclaps; backing vocals	"Instant Karma!" (1970)
	John Barham	January 1970; February, May–July 1971	harpsichord; keyboards	"Who Has Seen the Wind?" (1970); Imagine (1971)
	Phil Spector	September–October 1970; February, May–July 1971	piano; backing vocals	John Lennon/Plastic Ono Band (1970); Imagine (1971)
	Jim Keltner	February, May–October 1971; 1971–1973; 1974	drums; tabla; percussion	Imagine (1971); Fly (1971); "Happy Xmas (War Is Over)" (1971); "Listen, the Snow Is Falling" (1971); Some Time in New York City (1972); Approximately Infinite Universe (1973); Live in New York City (1986); Walls and Bridges (1974)
	Joey Molland	February, May–July 1971	acoustic guitar	Imagine (1971)
	Tom Evans	February, May–July 1971	acoustic guitar	Imagine (1971)
	Ted Turner	February, May–July 1971	acoustic guitar	Imagine (1971)
	Rod Linton	February, May–July 1971	acoustic guitar	Imagine (1971)
	Andy Davis	February, May–July 1971	acoustic guitar	Imagine (1971)
	John Tout	February, May–July 1971	piano	Imagine (1971)
	Steve Brendell	February, May–July 1971	double bass; percussion	Imagine (1971)
	Mike Pinder	February, May–July 1971	percussion	Imagine (1971)
	Chris Osborne	February, August–October 1971	dobro; guitar	Fly (1971); "Happy Xmas (War Is Over)" (1971)
	Frank Zappa	June 1971	guitar; vocals	Some Time in New York City (1972)
	Aynsley Dunbar	June 1971	drums	Some Time in New York City (1972)
	Bob Harris	June 1971	keyboards; vocals	Some Time in New York City (1972)
	Howard Kaylan	June 1971	vocals	Some Time in New York City (1972)
	Mark Volman	June 1971	vocals	Some Time in New York City (1972)
	Jim Pons	June 1971	bass guitar; vocals	Some Time in New York City (1972)
	Don Preston	June 1971	Mini-Moog	Some Time in New York City (1972)
	Ian Underwood	June 1971	keyboard; vocals; woodwinds	Some Time in New York City (1972)
	Hugh McCracken	October 1971	guitar	"Happy Xmas (War Is Over)" (1971); "Listen, the Snow Is Falling" (1971)
	Stuart Scharf	October 1971	guitar	"Happy Xmas (War Is Over)" (1971)
	Teddy Irwin	October 1971	guitar	"Happy Xmas (War Is Over)" (1971)
	Wayne 'Tex' Gabriel	1971–1973	guitar	Some Time in New York City (1972); Approximately Infinite Universe (1973); Live in New York City (1986)
	Gary Van Scyoc	1971–1973	bass	Some Time in New York City (1972); Approximately Infinite Universe (1973); Live in New York City (1986)
	John Ward	1971–1973	bass	Some Time in New York City (1972); Approximately Infinite Universe (1973); Live in New York City (1986)
	Stan Bronstein	1971–1973	saxophone; flute	Some Time in New York City (1972); Approximately Infinite Universe (1973); Live in New York City (1986)
	Adam Ippolito	1971–1973	piano; organ	Some Time in New York City (1972); Approximately Infinite Universe (1973); Live in New York City (1986)
	John La Boosca	1971–1973	piano	Some Time in New York City (1972); Approximately Infinite Universe (1973); Live in New York City (1986)
	Richard Frank Jr.	1971–1973	drums; percussion	Some Time in New York City (1972); Approximately Infinite Universe (1973); Live in New York City (1986)
	Kenneth Ascher	1973; 1974	piano; organ; mellotron	Feeling the Space (1973); Mind Games (1973); Walls and Bridges (1974)
	Arthur Jenkins	1973; 1974	percussion	Feeling the Space (1973); Mind Games (1973); Walls and Bridges (1974)
	Rick Marotta	1973; 1974	drums	Feeling the Space (1973); Mind Games (1973); Let's Have a Dream – 1974 One Step Festival (2022)
	Michael Brecker	1973	saxophone	Feeling the Space (1973); Mind Games (1973); Let's Have a Dream – 1974 One Step Festival (2022)
	David Spinozza	1973	guitar	Feeling the Space (1973); Mind Games (1973)
	Gordon Edwards	1973	bass	Feeling the Space (1973); Mind Games (1973)
	Sneaky Pete Kleinow	1973	pedal steel guitar	Feeling the Space (1973); Mind Games (1973)
	Robert Kreiner	1973	bass	Feeling the Space (1973)
	David Friedman	1973	vibes	Feeling the Space (1973)
	Don Brooks	1973	harmonica	Feeling the Space (1973)
	Jeremy Steig	1973	flute	Feeling the Space (1973)
	Andrew Smith	1973	drums	Feeling the Space (1973)
	Jesse Ed Davis	1974	acoustic guitar; lead guitar	Walls and Bridges (1974)
	Eddie Mottau	1974	acoustic guitar	Walls and Bridges (1974)
	Andy Muson	1974	bass	Let's Have a Dream – 1974 One Step Festival (2022)
	Steve Gadd	1974	drums	Let's Have a Dream – 1974 One Step Festival (2022)
	Randy Brecker	1974	trumpet	Let's Have a Dream – 1974 One Step Festival (2022)
	Dan Grolnick	1974	electric piano; clavinet; Mellotron	Let's Have a Dream – 1974 One Step Festival (2022)
	Steve Khan	1974	guitar	Let's Have a Dream – 1974 One Step Festival (2022)

== Line-ups ==
Band	Members	Release contributions and live performances
Plastic Ono Band (June 1969)	John Lennon – vocals, acoustic guitar; Yoko Ono – handclaps, tambourines, backing vocals; Tom Smothers – acoustic guitar, backing vocals; Timothy Leary, Rabbi Abraham Feinberg, Joseph Schwartz, Rosemary Woodruff Leary, Petula Clark, Dick Gregory, Allen Ginsberg, Murray the K, Derek Taylor – backing vocals, handclaps	"Give Peace a Chance"
Plastic Ono Band (June 1969)	John Lennon – acoustic guitar; Yoko Ono – vocals	"Remember Love"
Plastic Ono Band (September 1969)	John Lennon – lead vocals, rhythm guitar; Yoko Ono – vocals; Eric Clapton – lead guitar, backing vocals; Klaus Voormann – bass; Alan White – drums	Toronto Rock and Roll Revival Festival (later released as Live Peace in Toronto 1969)
Plastic Ono Band (September 1969)	John Lennon – vocals, rhythm guitar; Yoko Ono – vocals; Eric Clapton – lead guitar, backing vocals; Klaus Voormann – bass; Ringo Starr – drums	"Cold Turkey"/"Don't Worry Kyoko"
Plastic Ono Supergroup (December 1969)	John Lennon – vocals, guitar; Yoko Ono – vocals; Eric Clapton ("Derek Claptoe") – guitar; Delaney Bramlett ("Bilanie") – guitar; Bonnie Bramlett ("Donnie") – percussion; Jim Gordon ("Jim Bordom") – drums; George Harrison ("George Harrisong") – guitar; Nicky Hopkins ("Sticky Topkins") – electric piano; Bobby Keys ("Robbie Knees") – sax; Keith Moon ("Kief Spoon") – drums; Billy Preston ("Billy Presstud") – organ; Klaus Voormann ("Raus Doorman") – bass; Alan White ("Dallas White") – drums; Jim Price – trumpet	UNICEF Peace for Christmas Concert (later released on Some Time in New York City as Live Jam)
Plastic Ono Band (January 1970)	John Lennon – lead vocal, acoustic guitar, piano, backing vocal; George Harrison – electric guitar, piano, backing vocal; Klaus Voormann – bass guitar, electric piano, backing vocal; Alan White – drums, piano, backing vocal; Billy Preston – organ, backing vocal; Yoko Ono – backing vocal; Mal Evans – chimes, handclaps, backing vocal	"Instant Karma!"
Plastic Ono Band (January 1970)	Yoko Ono – vocals, recorder; John Lennon – guitar; John Barham – harpsichord	"Who Has Seen the Wind?"
Plastic Ono Band (September–October 1970)	John Lennon – vocals, guitar, piano, organ; Klaus Voormann – bass; Ringo Starr – drums; Billy Preston – piano; Phil Spector – piano	John Lennon/Plastic Ono Band
Plastic Ono Band (October–November 1970)	Yoko Ono – vocals; John Lennon – guitar; Klaus Voormann – bass; Ringo Starr – drums; George Harrison – sitar	Yoko Ono/Plastic Ono Band
Plastic Ono Band (January–March 1971)	Yoko Ono – vocals; John Lennon – guitar; Klaus Voormann – bass guitar; Jim Gordon – drums	"Open Your Box"
Plastic Ono Band (January–February 1971)	John Lennon – vocals, guitar; Yoko Ono – backing vocals, piano; Bobby Keys – saxophone; Billy Preston – piano, keyboards; Klaus Voormann – bass; Jim Gordon – drums	"Power to the People"
Plastic Ono Band (February, May–July 1971)	John Lennon – vocals, guitar, piano, harmonica; George Harrison – lead guitar, dobro; Nicky Hopkins – piano; Klaus Voormann – bass; Alan White – drums, percussion; Jim Keltner – drums; Jim Gordon – drums; John Barham – keyboards; Phil Spector – backing vocal; Joey Molland – acoustic guitar; Tom Evans – acoustic guitar; Ted Turner – acoustic guitar; Rod Linton – acoustic guitar; Andy Davis – acoustic guitar; John Tout – piano; Steve Brendell – double bass, percussion; Mike Pinder – percussion	Imagine
Plastic Ono Band (February and August 1971)	Yoko Ono – vocals, percussion; John Lennon – guitar, piano, organ; Klaus Voormann – bass, guitar, percussion; Jim Keltner – drums, tabla, percussion; Jim Gordon – tabla; Bobby Keys – percussion; Chris Osborne – dobro	Fly
Plastic Ono Band with the Mothers of Invention (June 1971)	John Lennon – guitar, vocals; Yoko Ono – bag, vocals; Klaus Voormann – bass guitar, vocals; Frank Zappa – guitar, vocals; Aynsley Dunbar – drums; Bob Harris – keyboards, vocals; Howard Kaylan – vocals; Jim Pons – bass guitar, vocals; Don Preston – Mini-Moog; Ian Underwood – keyboard, vocals, woodwinds; Mark Volman – vocals	6 June 1971 concert at the Fillmore East (later released on Some Time in New York City as Live Jam as well as Playground Psychotics, and The Mothers 1971)
Plastic Ono Band (October 1971)	John Lennon – guitars, vocals; Yoko Ono – vocals; Jim Keltner – drums; Nicky Hopkins – keyboards; Hugh McCracken – guitar; Chris Osbourne – guitar; Stuart Scharf – guitar; Teddy Irwin – guitar	"Happy Xmas (War Is Over)"
Plastic Ono Band (October 1971)	Yoko Ono – vocals; John Lennon – guitars; Jim Keltner – drums; Nicky Hopkins – keyboards; Hugh McCracken – guitar; Klaus Voormann – bass	"Listen, the Snow Is Falling"
Plastic Ono Band with Elephant's Memory (1971-1973)	John Lennon – guitars, vocals, piano; Yoko Ono – vocals, piano; Jim Keltner – drums, percussion; Wayne 'Tex' Gabriel – guitar; Gary Van Scyoc – bass; Stan Bronstein – saxophone, flute; Adam Ippolito – piano, organ; John La Boosca – piano; Richard Frank Jr. – drums, percussion; John Ward – bass	Some Time in New York City; One to One Concerts (later released as Live in New York City); 1972 MDA Show of Strength; Approximately Infinite Universe
Plastic Ono Band (1973)	Yoko Ono – vocals; John Lennon ("John O'Cean") – guitar; Jim Keltner – drums; David Spinozza – guitar; Kenneth Ascher – piano, organ, mellotron; Gordon Edwards – bass; Michael Brecker – saxophone; Arthur Jenkins – percussion; David Friedman – vibes; Sneaky Pete Kleinow – pedal steel guitar; Don Brooks – harmonica; Jeremy Steig – flute; Something Different – chorus; Andrew Smith – drums; Robert Kreiner – bass; Rick Marotta – drums	Feeling the Space
Plastic U.F.Ono Band (1973)	John Lennon – vocals, rhythm guitar, slide guitar, percussion; Jim Keltner – drums; David Spinozza – lead guitar; Kenneth Ascher – piano, organ; Gordon Edwards – bass; Arthur Jenkins – percussion; Michael Brecker – saxophone; Sneaky Pete Kleinow – pedal steel guitar.; Rick Marotta – drums; Something Different – chorus	Mind Games
Plastic Ono Nuclear Band (1974)	John Lennon – vocals, guitar, piano; Klaus Voormann – bass; Jim Keltner – drums; Nicky Hopkins – piano; Bobby Keys – tenor saxophone; Kenneth Ascher – electric piano, clavinet, Mellotron; Arthur Jenkins – percussion; Jesse Ed Davis – acoustic guitar, lead guitar; Eddie Mottau – acoustic guitar	Walls and Bridges
Plastic Ono Super Band (1974)	Yoko Ono – vocals; Andy Muson – bass; Rick Marotta – drums; Steve Gadd – drums; Randy Brecker – trumpet; Michael Brecker – saxophone; Dan Grolnick – electric piano, clavinet, Mellotron; Steve Khan – guitar	Yoko Ono tour of Japan; Let's Have a Dream – 1974 One Step Festival
Disbanded.
Yoko Ono Plastic Ono Band (2009)	Yoko Ono – vocals; Sean Lennon – acoustic and electric guitars, piano, keyboards, bass, drums, percussion; Cornelius – guitars, bass, Tenorion, programming, percussion; Yuka Honda – piano, organ, percussion; Hirotaka Shimizu – guitars, percussion; Yuko Araki – drums, percussion; Shahzad Ismaily – guitars, bass, drums, percussion; Michael Leonhart – trumpet, vibraphone, percussion; Erik Friedlander – cello; Daniel Carter – tenor saxophone, flute; Indigo Street – guitar	Don't Stop Me!; Between My Head and the Sky
Yoko Ono Plastic Ono Band (2009–Present)	Yoko Ono – vocals; Sean Lennon – guitar, vocals, bass, keyboards, drums; Yuka Honda – keyboards; Keigo Oyamada – guitar; Hirotaka Shimizu – guitar, bass; Yuko Araka – drums; Michael Leonhart – trumpet; Erik Friedlander – cello	We Are Plastic Ono Band" Tour
Plastic Ono Band (February 2010)	Yoko Ono – vocals; Eric Clapton – guitar; Klaus Voormann – bass; Jim Keltner – drums; Sean Lennon – vocals, guitar	16 February 2010 concert at the Brooklyn Academy of Music
The Flaming Lips with Yoko Ono/Plastic Ono Band (2011)	Yoko Ono – vocals; Sean Lennon – guitar; Wayne Coyne – vocals, guitar, keyboards; Michael Ivins – bass, keyboards, backing vocals; Steven Drozd – vocals, drums, guitar, keyboards, backing vocals; Kliph Scurlock – drums, percussion; Derek Brown – guitar, keyboards, percussion, backing vocals	The Flaming Lips 2011 #11: The Flaming Lips with Yoko Ono/Plastic Ono Band
Yoko Ono Plastic Ono Band (2013)	Yoko Ono – vocals; Sean Lennon – guitar, piano, bass, synthesizer, percussion; Cornelius – remixing; Yuka Honda – keyboards, synthesizer; Lenny Kravitz – drums; Nels Cline – guitar; Questlove – drums; Bill Dobrow – drums; Hirotaka Shimizu – guitar; Keigo Oyamada – bass, guitar; Julian Lage – guitar	Take Me to the Land of Hell
