= Woman Power =

Woman power may refers to:

- Woman Power, a feminist journal published by the Congress of American Women between 1946 and 1950.
- "Woman Power": a song on Yoko Ono's album Feeling the Space.
