= Yes, I'm a Witch Too =

Remix album by Yoko Ono
- Released: February 19, 2016
- Recorded: 2014–2015
- Label: Manimal Vinyl
- Producer: Rob Stevens

Yoko Ono chronology
Take Me to the Land of Hell (2013)	Yes, I'm a Witch Too (2016)	Warzone (2018)

Singles from Yes, I'm a Witch Too
- 1. "Hell in Paradise 2016" Released: December 2, 2016

Yes, I'm a Witch Too is a collaboration and remix LP from Yoko Ono. The street date is February 19, 2016 via Manimal Vinyl Records. The LP features remixes and collaborations from Death Cab for Cutie, Moby, Portugal. The Man, Sparks, Peter Bjorn and John, Miike Snow, Sean Lennon, Cibo Matto and others. It is a sequel to 2007's Yes, I'm a Witch.

The LP features cover art by Scott Rudd with an image of Ono by Karl Lagerfeld.

== Release and promotion ==
The album was released as a double vinyl set, as well as on CD and in various digital formats.

The reworkings of "Forgive Me My Love" (by Death Cab for Cutie) and "Soul Got Out of the Box" (by Portugal. The Man) were released as promotional singles in 2015. The Miike Snow remix of "Catman", which was originally published on Approximately Infinite Universe in 1973 as "Catman (The Rosies are Coming)", was released on January 22, 2016. A video for "Catman" was directed by actress/activist Rose McGowan and released in July 2016 on Pitchfork.

== Track listing ==
All songs written by Yoko Ono.

1. Danny Tenaglia – "Walking on Thin Ice"
2. Death Cab for Cutie – "Forgive Me My Love"
3. Peter Bjorn and John – "Mrs. Lennon"
4. Sparks – "Give Me Something"
5. Penguin Prison – "She Gets Down on Her Knees"
6. Sean Ono Lennon – "Dogtown"
7. Dave Audé – "Wouldnit"
8. Jack Douglas – "Move on Fast"
9. Portugal. The Man – "Soul Got Out of the Box"
10. Blow Up – "Approximately Infinite Universe"
11. Cibo Matto – "Yes, I'm Your Angel"
12. Tune-Yards – "Warrior Woman"
13. Automatique – "Coffin Car"
14. John Palumbo – "I Have a Woman Inside My Soul"
15. Miike Snow – "Catman"
16. Ebony Bones! – "No Bed for Beatle John"
17. Moby – "Hell in Paradise"
