= Let's Have a Dream – 1974 One Step Festival =

Let's Have a Dream – 1974 One Step Festival Live

Live album by Yoko Ono and Plastic Ono Super Band
- Released: 24 August 2022
- Recorded: 10 August 1974
- Venue: One Step Festival (Kōriyama)
- Genre: Rock
- Length: 48:19
- Label: Super Fuji Discs

Yoko Ono and Plastic Ono Super Band chronology
Warzone (2018)	Let's Have a Dream – 1974 One Step Festival Live (2022)	Power to the People (2025)

Singles from Let's Have a Dream – 1974 One Step Festival
- 1. "Yume O Motou" Released: 24 August 2022; 2. "Move On Fast" Released: 24 August 2022

Let's Have a Dream – 1974 One Step Festival Live is a live album by singer-songwriter and artist Yoko Ono, recorded with the Plastic Ono Super Band on the opening night of her 1974 tour in Japan. It is the third live album released by Ono following Live Peace in Toronto (1969) and the Live Jam disc of Some Time in New York City (1972), both also recorded with Plastic Ono Band.

== Background ==
The live album was recorded on 10 August 1974, the final date of the One Step Festival, held in Koriyama, Fukushima Prefecture. The date was the opening date of a six-date tour by Ono in Japan during August 1974:

- 10 August 1974 – One Step Festival, Tokyo
- 11 August 1974 – Nakano Sun Plaza, Tokyo
- 12 August 1974 – Shinjuku Kosei Nenkin Hall
- 13 August 1974 – Shi Kokaido, Nagoya
- 16 August 1974 – Kenritsu Taikukan, Hiroshima
- 19 August 1974 – Kosei Nenkin Kaikan, Osaka

Fifty thousand people attended the show at One Step Festival.

The tour took place during the "Lost Weekend", when Yoko was separated from her husband John Lennon, and during which time she recorded the album A Story, which remained unreleased until the 1990s due to problems with Apple Records.

=== Songs ===
The album includes songs from Ono's albums Fly (1971), Approximately Infinite Universe (1973) and Feeling the Space (1973). She also performed her Japanese single "Yume O Motou" (1974) and another Japanese song titled "One Way Road", which never appeared on any of her studio albums and had its first official release through this live album.

== Reception ==
Pitchfork magazine gave the album a rating of 8.0 out of 10, noting that it was "the sound of Yoko Ono at her mischievous peak" and showcased "Ono's bizarre genius as well as her warmth, charisma, and downright lovability as a performer" as well as being a "triumphant cap to her early-'70s imperial period".

== Track listing ==
All tracks are written by Yoko Ono.

Let's Have a Dream track listing
No.	Title	Length
1.	"Mind Train"	5:16
2.	"Angry Young Woman"	4:57
3.	"Woman of Salem"	4:01
4.	"One Way Road"	5:19
5.	"I Felt Like Smashing My Face in a Clear Glass Window"	5:08
6.	"Don't Worry Kyoko"	5:52
7.	"Yume O Moto (Let's Have a Dream)"	5:03
8.	"Move on Fast"	5:02
9.	"Encore MC"	2:26
10.	"Yume O Moto" (Encore)	5:10
Total length:		48:19

== Personnel ==
- Yoko Ono – Vocals
- Andy Mewson – Bass
- Rick Marotta – Drums
- Steve Gadd - Drums
- Steve Khan – Guitar
- Don Grolnick – Keyboards
- Michael Brecker – Flute, Saxophone
- Randy Brecker – Trumpet

== Release history ==
Country	Date	Format	Label	Catalog	Ref.
Japan	24 August 2022	CD	Super Fuji Discs	FJSP-470	
Worldwide	14 September 2022	Streaming	Super Fuji Discs	—N/a	
Japan	5 October 2022	LP	Super Fuji Discs	FJSP-471	
