= Warzone (Yoko Ono album) =

Studio album by Yoko Ono
- Released: 24 October 2018
- Genres: Rock; pop
- Length: 41:10
- Label: Sony Music
- Producer: Thomas Bartlett

Yoko Ono chronology
Take Me to the Land of Hell (2013)	Warzone (2018)

Professional ratings
Aggregate scores
Source	Rating
Metacritic	69/100
Review scores
Source	Rating
The Guardian	3/5 stars
Pitchfork	6.3/10
Slant Magazine	3/5 stars

Warzone (stylized in all caps) is the sixteenth and final solo studio album by Yoko Ono released on 24 October 2018, her 50th anniversary as a musician. It consists of 13 songs she picked up and reconstructed from her past albums released from 1970 to 2009. It also includes the newest version of the 1971 song "Imagine" by John Lennon. Since Take Me to the Land of Hell in 2013, this is the Ono's first in five years and 20th original album in total (including collaborations with John Lennon). This includes a bonus track only for Japan. An English-born singer, Anohni listed Warzone as her favorite album of the 2010s.

== Interview ==
The version of "Imagine" included in the album gained attention for adding Ono into the credit as well as John Lennon. Regarding the release, Yoko said, "I was afraid of renewing this song. Tom (Thomas Bartlett, a producer) was also a little bit afraid, I think. People all over the world know this song. However, I decided to carry out because it matches the theme of the album. The world is far too confused. For anyone, things have been so difficult. We are living in the war zone now... I like creation with the new way, because things are changing every day."

== Track listing ==
All songs written by Yoko Ono, except "Imagine" written by John Lennon and Yoko Ono.

No.	Title	Original album	Length
1.	"Warzone"	Rising	3:08
2.	"Hell in Paradise"	Starpeace	3:39
3.	"Now or Never"	Approximately Infinite Universe	4:59
4.	"Where Do We Go from Here"	Rising	2:47
5.	"Woman Power"	Feeling the Space	4:01
6.	"It's Gonna Rain"	Starpeace	3:07
7.	"Why"	Yoko Ono/Plastic Ono Band	2:39
8.	"Children Power"	Starpeace	2:34
9.	"I Love All of Me"	Starpeace	3:53
10.	"Teddy Bear"	Starpeace	4:07
11.	"I'm Alive"	Between My Head and the Sky	0:22
12.	"I Love You Earth"	Starpeace	2:32
13.	"Imagine"	Imagine	3:22

Japan bonus track
No.	Title	Length
14.	"Midsummer New York" (alternate version)	2:36

The Japanese edition includes an alternate recording of "Midsummer New York", recorded during the original Fly sessions in 1971.

== Personnel ==
- Yoko Ono – vocals (all tracks)
- Caleb Burhans – violin (2, 5, 9)
- Courtney Orlando – violin (2, 5, 9)
- Doug Wieselman – bass clarinet (4, 10)
- Erik Friedlander – cello (4, 10)
- Laura Lutzke – violin (2, 5, 9)
- Marc Ribot – acoustic guitar (3), electric guitar (3, 8)
- Nico Muhly – string arrangements (2, 5, 9)
- Patti Kilroy – violin (2, 5, 9)
- Kassa Overall – drums (3, 5, 8)
- Thomas Bartlett – bass (5), electronics (1–8, 13), keyboards (1–10, 13), piano (1, 6, 9–10, 12–13)

Animals

- Baboon (2)
- Crows (1, 7, 8)
- Elephant (1, 2, 7)
- Monkeys (8)
- Panther (2)
- Whale (8)
- Wolf (1, 7, 8)

Technical

- Produced by Yoko Ono and Thomas Bartlett
- Recorded by Thomas Bartlett, Chris Allen and Patrick Dillett
- Assistant engineers: James Yost, Owen Mulholland and Grant Valentine
- Recorded at Reservoir Studios and Sear Sound
- Mixed by Chris Allen at Sear Sound
- Mastered by Stephen Marcussen at Marcussen Mastering
- Album art concept and drawings by Yoko Ono

Credits for "Midsummer New York"

- Recorded August 23, 1971 at Ascot Sound Studios and Record Plant, NYC.
- Yoko Ono – voice
- John Lennon – guitar
- Klaus Voormann – bass
- Jim Keltner – drums

== Release history ==
Country	Date	Format	Label	Catalog	Ref.
United States	19 October 2018	CD; LP; LP (White Vinyl)	Chimera Music	CHIM-52	
Japan	24 October 2018	CD	Sony Records International	SICX-30062	
