= New York Rock =

Soundtrack album / Original cast recording by Yoko Ono
- Released: 4 May 1994
- Recorded: Quad Recording, New York City
- Genres: Pop; new wave
- Length: 77:16
- Label: Capitol
- Producer: Rob Stevens

Yoko Ono chronology
| Walking on Thin Ice (1992) | New York Rock (1994) | Rising (1995) |

Professional ratings
Review scores
| Source | Rating |
|---|---|
| AllMusic | 4/5 stars |

New York Rock is an off-Broadway musical by avant-garde artist Yoko Ono. It is a fictionalised account of her marriage to songwriter and Beatle John Lennon. The musical contains many songs from Ono's albums throughout the years, as well as several new tracks, "Warzone" and "Where Do We Go from Here", which were reworked for inclusion on Rising.

== Track listing ==
All songs written by Yoko Ono.

1. "It Happened" (Mother) – 1:26
2. "I'll Always Be with You" [*] – 2:27
3. "Spec of Dust" – 2:09
4. "Midsummer New York" – 1:58
5. "What a Bastard the World Is" – 3:19
6. "Loneliness" – 3:09
7. "Give Me Something" – 1:21
8. "Light on the Other Side" [*] – 1:58
9. "Tomorrow May Never Come" – 1:54
10. "Don't Be Scared" – 3:14
11. "Growing Pain" – 2:37
12. "Warzone" [*] – 1:41
13. "Never Say Goodbye" – 4:17
14. "O'Sanity" – 2:19
15. "I Want My Love to Rest Tonight" – 4:15
16. "I Felt Like Smashing My Face in a Clear Glass Window" – 3:04
17. "Now or Never" – 3:20
18. "We're All Water" – 3:04
19. "Yes I'm Your Angel" – 2:44
20. "It Happened" (Jill) – 1:28
21. "Where Do We Go from Here" [*] – 2:02
22. "Sleepless Night" – 2:00
23. "No, No, No" – 1:34
24. "Even When You're Far Away" – 3:02
25. "Hell in Paradise" – 2:47
26. "Toyboat" – 2:59
27. "Story of an Oak Tree" [*] – 2:18
28. "Goodbye Sadness" – 4:10
29. "Never Say Goodbye" (Bill) [hidden track] – 4:23

([*] = new track)

== Cast ==
- Mother – Jan Horvarth
- Little Bill/Boy – Sean Dooley
- Bill – Pat McRoberts
- Jill – Lynette Perry
- Ignorance – Pete Herber
- Violence – Walter O'Neil
- Violence II – Paul Mahos
- Streetkid – Aaron Blackshear
- Streetkid – Peter Kim
- Streetkid- Evan Ferrante

== Singles ==
- "Never Say Goodbye" (CD)

== Songs not on the CD ==
- "It Happened" (Bill)
- "If Only" (Jill)
