= Angel (Yoko Ono song) =

Single by Yoko Ono
- Released: 26 August 2014
- Genre: Dance
- Label: Mind Train / Twisted
- Producer(s): Yoko Ono

Yoko Ono singles chronology
"Walking on Thin Ice" (2013)	"Angel" (2014)	"Woman Power" (2015)

"Angel" is a single released by Yoko Ono on 26 August 2014 through Mind Train / Twisted. It reached number one on Billboard's Hot Dance Club Play chart.

== Track listing ==
Remixes Part 1

1. "Angel" (Dank Club mix) – 5:03
2. "Angel" (Dank Trap mix) – 4:04
3. "Angel" (Soul Cartel Club mix) – 6:02
4. "Angel" (Soul Cartel Dub mix) – 6:02
5. "Angel" (Dave Audé Radio edit) – 3:35
6. "Angel" (Dave Audé Club mix) – 5:45
7. "Angel" (Dave Audé Dub mix) – 5:05
8. "Angel" (Dave Audé Instrumental) – 5:45
9. "Angel" (Mike Cruz Club mix) – 6:54
10. "Angel" (Mike Cruz Dub mix) – 6:54

Remixes Part 2

1. "Angel" (Rosabel Club mix) – 7:52
2. "Angel" (Rosabel Vocal Dub) – 7:36
3. "Angel" (Rosabel Dub mix) – 7:35
4. "Angel" (Emjae Club mix) – 4:07
5. "Angel" (DJLW Club mix) – 4:13
6. "Angel" (DJLW Instrumental) – 3:26

Remixes Part 3

1. "Angel" (Superchumbo Club mix) – 6:16
2. "Angel" (Superchumbo Dub mix) – 7:02
3. "Angel" (Fagault & Marina Club) – 5:24
4. "Angel" (Fagault & Marina Instrumental) – 5:24
5. "Angel" (The Carry Nation Everything mix) – 7:14
6. "Angel" (The Carry Nation Piano Dub) – 6:30
7. "Angel" (Bordertown Club mix) – 4:12
8. "Angel" (Bordertown Dub mix) – 4:12
9. "Angel" (JamLimmat and Miguel Picasso in Heaven Mix) – 6:50
10. "Angel" (JamLimmat and Miguel Picasso in Heaven Instrumental) – 6:50

== Charts ==
Chart (2014)	Peak position
US Dance Club Songs (Billboard)	1
