= Now or Never (Yoko Ono song) =

- Single cover depicting My Lai Massacre victims

Single by Yoko Ono

from the album Approximately Infinite Universe
- B-side: "Move on Fast"
- Released: 13 November 1972
- Genre: Rock
- Length: 4:55
- Label: Apple
- Songwriter: Yoko Ono
- Producers: John Lennon, Yoko Ono

Yoko Ono singles chronology
"Mind Train" (1972)	"Now or Never" (1972)	"Death of Samantha" (1973)

"Now or Never" is a song written by Yoko Ono that was first released on her 1973 album Approximately Infinite Universe. It was also the lead single off the album, backed by "Move on Fast". A remixed version of "Move on Fast" was later released as a single and reached #1 on the Billboard Dance Club Songs chart.

== Background ==
"Now or Never" is a political song. According to John Lennon's biographer Peter Doggett, the lyrics of "Now or Never" sum up Ono's philosophy that "Dream you dream alone is just a dream/But dream we dream together is reality." Cash Box described it as having "a delicate social commentary with an extremely important message that should be heard by all." Record World said that Ono is "more melodically and lyrically sound" than on previous songs and that this song has an "important message, so listen". New York Times music critic Stephen Holden described this line as expressing a "Beatles-style utopianism". A Yoko Ono press release described the song as a "wistful wake-up call to a tuned-out, slacked-off America". Vietnam War historian Lee Andresen considered the song to be a protest against the war.

The notorious cover of the single release, which depicted dead Vietnamese victims of the My Lai Massacre reinforced the Vietnam connection. Andresen describes the cover as being "the most painfully graphic of any produced by record companies during the war". Ben Urish and Ken Bielen describe the lyrics as being "interrogative". Rolling Stone reviewer Nick Tosches was underwhelmed by the lyrics, using lines such as "People of America/When will we stop/It is now or never" as examples of the "obnoxiousness" of Ono's lyrics at the time, describing them as "philosophical and political party-line corn that went out of style with last season's prime-time TV."

The music of "Now or Never" is folk music-like in the vein of early Bob Dylan. It was recorded in February and March 1972 at the Record Plant East in New York. John Lennon played guitar and Elephant's Memory provided the other backing instrumentation. Ono and Lennon co-produced the recording.

== Live performances ==
Lennon and Ono rehearsed "Now or Never" for their One on One concerts at Madison Square Garden in New York in August 1972, prior to any official release of the song, but the song was ultimately not performed in the actual concerts. The couple did perform the song at their TV appearance for the Jerry Lewis Telethon a few days later on September 4, 1972. "Now or Never" was the second of three songs they played at the telethon, after "Imagine" and before "Give Peace a Chance". At the time Lennon was under threat of deportation from the United States, and Ono introduced the song by stating that "John and I love this country very much and we're very happy that we're still here." The telethon would prove to be the couple's last performance with Elephant's Memory.

== Other versions ==
In 1984, a revised version of "Now or Never" was released on the album Every Man Has a Woman celebrating Ono's 50th birthday. This version used a children's choir to provide the vocals. According to Urich and Bielen, this added urgency to the lyrics, "as if a very aware child were chastising the adults for what they were permitting the world to become." The instrumentation was from the original 1972 sessions, including Lennon and Elephant's Memory.

In 1994, the song was included in Ono's Off-Broadway musical New York Rock. According to Holden, "Now or Never" "distills the childlike quality of a show that is as sweetly idealistic as it is hopelessly naive."

In 2018, Ono included a new version of the song on her album Warzone. This version had the same lyrics but different instrumentation, including synthesizers. According to Pitchfork contributor Sasha Geffen, this version differed in tone from the original in that the original asked the United States to dream of a reality without violence while the new version is sad that the country chose "never".

== See also ==
- List of anti-war songs
