= Yokokimthurston =

Studio album by Yoko Ono, Kim Gordon and Thurston Moore
- Released: September 25, 2012
- Recorded: 2011
- Studios: Sear Sound, New York City
- Length: 60:35
- Label: Chimera Music

Yoko Ono chronology
Onomix (2012)	Yokokimthurston (2012)	Take Me to the Land of Hell (2013)

Kim Gordon chronology
SYR5 (2000)	Yokokimthurston (2012)	No Home Record (2018)

Thurston Moore studio albums chronology
Demolished Thoughts (2011)	Yokokimthurston (2012)	@ (2013)

Singles from Yokokimthurston
- 1. "Early in the Morning" Released: June 5, 2012

Yokokimthurston (stylized in all caps) is a collaborative album by Yoko Ono, Kim Gordon and Thurston Moore, released by Chimera Music on September 25, 2012. "Early in the Morning" was released as a single, on June 5, 2012. The cover is from a Kim Gordon painting.

== Critical reception ==
Professional ratings
Aggregate scores
Source	Rating
AnyDecentMusic?	4.3/10
Metacritic	57/100
Review scores
Source	Rating
AllMusic	3/5 stars
Consequence of Sound	D−
No Ripcord	5/10
Paste	3.7/10
Pitchfork	5/10
PopMatters	5/10
Rolling Stone	3/5 stars
Spectrum Culture	3.25/5
Tiny Mix Tapes	3/5 stars
Under the Radar	2/10

According to the review aggregator Metacritic, Yokokimthurston received "mixed or average reviews" based on a weighted average score of 57 out of 100 from 13 critic scores. On another aggregator AnyDecentMusic?, it was given an average of 4.3 out of 10 based on 8 reviews.

== Track listing ==
All songs written by Kim Gordon, Thurston Moore and Yoko Ono.

1. "I Missed You Listening" – 9:58
2. "Running the Risk" – 9:38
3. "I Never Told You, Did I?" – 7:04
4. "Mirror Mirror" – 9:45
5. "Let's Get There" – 9:34
6. "Early in the Morning" – 14:36
