= Hold Me (Yoko Ono song) =

Single by Yoko Ono
- Released: 3 February 2013
- Genre: Dance
- Length: 3:55
- Label: Mind Train / Twisted
- Producers: Yoko Ono, Dave Aude

Yoko Ono singles chronology
| "I'm Moving On" (2012) | "Hold Me" (2013) | "Walking on Thin Ice" (2013) |

"Hold Me" is a single released by Yoko Ono on 3 February 2013, by Mind Train / Twisted. Several remixes featuring Dave Aude were released in 2013, helping the single gain significant dance club airplay and allowing it to hit number one on Billboard's Hot Dance Club Play chart.

== Track list ==
Remixes Part 1

1. "Hold Me" (Dave Audè original mix) [feat. Yoko Ono] – 3:54
2. "Hold Me" (Dave Audè club mix) [feat. Yoko Ono] – 7:15
3. "Hold Me" (Dave Audè instrumental) [feat. Yoko Ono] – 7:15
4. "Hold Me" (Emjae club mix) [feat. Yoko Ono] – 6:42
5. "Hold Me" (Emjae dub) [feat. Yoko Ono] – 6:42
6. "Hold Me" (Emjae alternative mix) [feat. Yoko Ono] – 8:19
7. "Hold Me" (Emjae alternative instrumental) [feat. Yoko Ono] – 8:19
8. "Hold Me" (Ralphi Rosario club mix) [feat. Yoko Ono] – 7:42
9. "Hold Me" (Ralphi Rosario dub) [feat. Yoko Ono] – 7:42

Remixes Part 2

1. "Hold Me" (R3HAB vocal mix) [feat. Yoko Ono] – 4:07
2. "Hold Me" (R3HAB instrumental) [feat. Yoko Ono] – 4:03
3. "Hold Me" (Papercha$er vocal mix) [feat. Yoko Ono] – 5:28
4. "Hold Me" (Papercha$er Money mix) [feat. Yoko Ono] – 4:59
5. "Hold Me" (Papercha$er instrumental) [feat. Yoko Ono] – 4:59
6. "Hold Me" (Dirtyloud club mix) [feat. Yoko Ono] – 4:56
7. "Hold Me" (Dirtyloud dub) [feat. Yoko Ono] – 4:46
8. "Hold Me" (Ivan & Nacho mix) [feat. Yoko Ono] – 7:29
9. "Hold Me" (Ivan & Nacho dub) [feat. Yoko Ono] – 7:29

== Charts ==
=== Weekly charts ===
| Chart (2013) | Peak position |
|---|---|
| US Dance Club Songs (Billboard) | 1 |
| US Hot Dance/Electronic Songs (Billboard) | 19 |
| Global Dance Tracks (Billboard) | 27 |

=== Year-end charts ===
| Chart (2013) | Position |
|---|---|
| US Dance Club Songs (Billboard) | 15 |
| US Hot Dance/Electronic Songs (Billboard) | 71 |

== See also ==
- List of number-one dance singles of 2013 (U.S.)
