= Remember Love (Yoko Ono song) =

Song by Yoko Ono

Single by Yoko Ono & Plastic Ono Band
- A-side: "Give Peace a Chance" (John Lennon & Plastic Ono Band)
- Released: 4 July 1969 (UK); 7 July 1969 (US)
- Recorded: 1 June 1969
- Studio: Room 1742, Queen Elizabeth Hotel, Montreal, Quebec, Canada
- Genre: Folk rock
- Length: 4:01
- Label: Apple
- Songwriter: Yoko Ono
- Producers: John Lennon; Yoko Ono

"Remember Love" is a song written by Yoko Ono and initially released as the B-side of John Lennon's and Ono's 1969 single "Give Peace a Chance".

== Recording ==
Although the label to the single states that the song was recorded in England, it was actually recorded in Room 1742 of the Queen Elizabeth Hotel in Montreal, Canada, in the early hours of the morning right after "Give Peace a Chance" was recorded. André Perry, who served as the recording engineer recalled:

I spent four hours doing the B-side of the 45, which was called "Remember Love," with Yoko Ono, and that was really a very sweet moment. I spent four hours with them, just the two of them and myself recording this, and she did a beautiful, beautiful version of it. She used to be knocked around as being not a great singer and, of course, she didn't have the greatest voice in the world.

Perry also stated that they started recording the song around 1:00 or 2:00 in the morning after the crowd that performed with Lennon and Ono on "Give Peace a Chance" had left. Perry stated that "that was wonderful...just the three of us in the room. And at night, so that was much more personal."

The room in which Lennon and Ono recorded "Remember Love" has remained a tourist draw ever since.

== Music and lyrics ==
"Remember Love" is in the key of D major. Beatle biographer John Blaney describes "Remember Love" as a "gentle ballad". Music professor Walter Everett describes the song as "folklike". Music lecturers Ben Urish and Ken Bielen describe it as a "yearning number of pure nursery rhyme innocence and simplicity. Music journalist John Kruth describes it as a "hypnotic lullaby" with "Zen-like lyrics" and a "simple, repetitive soul-soothing melody that gently assures the listener that everything is alright, at least for as long as the song lasts.

Lennon plays acoustic guitar to accompany Ono's vocal. Lennon plays in a style similar to that he used on the 1968 Beatles' songs "Julia" and "Dear Prudence". Some of the guitar melody is similar to that of the Beatles' song "Sun King", which Lennon wrote around the same time. According to music journalist Peter Doggett, Lennon learned to play guitar riffs like these from Donovan when they were both on a meditation trip in India. Everett compares the coda to Fleetwood Mac's instrumental "Albatross", stating that it alternates between a dominant seventh chord on E and a major chord on D.

The lyrics of "Remember Love" repeat the phrase "remember love" and in between state that "love is what it takes" to do various things such as live, see, fly or dream.

== Reception ==
Fab Four FAQ authors Stuart Shea and Robert Rodriguez describe it as "a charming little piece" and praise Lennon's "sympathetic production" which "enhanced the innocence of [Ono's] avowal". Shea and Rodriguez further noted that the song "offered listeners a rather tranquil counterpoint to the A-side's rousing sing-along.

Perry preferred "Remember Love" to "Give Peace a Chance".

== Re-release ==
"Remember Love" was re-released as a bonus track on the 1997 compact disc version of Lennon and Ono's Unfinished Music No. 1: Two Virgins.
