= Never Say Goodbye (Yoko Ono song) =

Single by Yoko Ono

from the album It's Alright (I See Rainbows)
- B-side: "Loneliness"
- Released: 25 January 1983 (7"); 22 February 1983 (12")
- Recorded: 1982
- Genre: Rock; new wave; dance
- Label: Polydor
- Songwriter(s): Yoko Ono
- Producer(s): Yoko Ono

Yoko Ono singles chronology
"My Man" (1982)	"Never Say Goodbye" (1983)	"Hell in Paradise" (1985)

"Never Say Goodbye" is the second single from Yoko Ono's 1982 album It's Alright (I See Rainbows). Like many of Ono's songs from this period, the lyrics deal with her emotional healing following the murder of her husband John Lennon. The upbeat new wave song samples a recording of Lennon screaming Yoko's name from their Wedding Album, followed by her son Sean waking her, as if it were a bad dream. The song garnered minor airplay upon release. "Loneliness" appeared on the B-side. The 1995 New York Rock version was also released as a single.

Cash Box said that "Ono uses synthesizers, angelic back-up vocals and natural effects like buzzing bees, chirping birds and a muffled male voice to create a dark, mystical and often haunting song."

"Never Say Goodbye" also appeared as a B-Side on the U.K. 12" release of John Lennon's single "Borrowed Time".

== Track listing ==
U.S. 7" single (25 January 1983)

1. "Never Say Goodbye" (7" version) – 3:23
2. "Loneliness" (7" version) – 3:21

U.S. 12" single (22 February 1983)

1. "Never Say Goodbye" (remix) – 4:27
2. "Loneliness" (remix) – 4:23

== Official versions ==
"Never Say Goodbye"

1. Album version – 4:25
2. 7" version – 3:23
3. 12" version – 4:27
4. Onobox edit – 4:01
5. 1997 remix - 4:17 (from It's Alright remastered edition)

"Loneliness"

1. 1974 album version – 3:33 (from shelved A Story album – unreleased until 1992)
2. 1982 album version – 3:47
3. 7" version – 3:21
4. 12" version – 4:23
5. 1997 remix – 3:34 (from It's Alright remastered edition)
