= Open Your Box =

1971 single by Yoko Ono

Single by Yoko Ono and The Plastic Ono Band
- A-side: "Power to the People" (UK) (John Lennon)
- Released: 12 March 1971
- Recorded: January–March 1971
- Length: 3:31
- Label: Apple
- Songwriter: Yoko Ono
- Producers: John Lennon; Yoko Ono

Yoko Ono and The Plastic Ono Band singles chronology
"Open Your Box" (1971)	"Mrs. Lennon" (1971)

"Open Your Box"
- 2001 remix single cover

Single by Yoko Ono
- Released: 2001
- Recorded: February–March 1971, remixed 2001
- Label: Parlophone
- Songwriter: Yoko Ono
- Producer: Yoko Ono

Yoko Ono singles chronology
"Hell in Paradise" (1985)	"Open Your Box" (2001)	"Kiss Kiss Kiss" (2002)

"Open Your Box" is a The Plastic Ono Band song by Yoko Ono, released on 12 March 1971 as the B-side of John Lennon's single "Power to the People". Lennon played guitar and produced the song.

In 1971, Ono's risqué lyrics were received in controversy ("box" is slang for vagina). Ono sings, "Open your box, open your trousers, open your sex, open your legs, open open open open open". The record was banned from radio in Britain, and was played on-air only when echo was added to blur the lyrics. Capitol Records, which distributed music by Apple Records in the United States, initially refused to issue the recording, and it was replaced as the B-side by another Ono track, "Touch Me".

"Open Your Box" was remixed and re-released by Orange Factory in 2001.

== Availability on albums ==
"Open Your Box" eventually appeared in 1971 on Ono's Fly album, under the title "Hirake" ("ひらけ" means "opening" in Japanese.) It also appears as a bonus track on a compact disc reissue of Yoko Ono/Plastic Ono Band, however in a different version.

The Orange Factory remixed version was an underground hit and brought about renewed interest in Ono's career, inspiring her to create her album Blueprint for a Sunrise and further the remix project to much success. A compilation of these remixes entitled Open Your Box was released in April 2007.

== Reception ==
Ultimate Classic Rock critic Michael Gallucci rated it as Ono's 6th best song, saying that it "is about sex...but the noisy chaos surrounding it is pure primal rage."

== Track listing ==
iTunes EP

1. "Open Your Box" (The Club)
2. "Open Your Box" (The Dub The Voice)
3. "Open Your Box" (Radio Edit)

== Official versions ==
1. Single version (censored) – 3:31 (as B-side of "Power to the People")
2. Album version (a.k.a. "Hirake") – 3:31
3. Alternate version – 7:35 (from Yoko Ono/Plastic Ono Band CD reissue)
4. Orange Factory Radio Edit (2001) – 4:37
5. Orange Factory Club Mix (2001) – 9:59
6. Orange Factory Dub (2001) – 9:59
7. Orange Factory Club Mix Edit – 6:20 (from Open Your Box compilation)

== Credits and personnel ==
- Yoko Ono – vocals, songwriting, production
- John Lennon – production, guitar
- Klaus Voormann – bass guitar
- Jim Gordon – drums

== Charts ==
Chart (2001–2002)	Peak position
UK Singles (The Official Charts Company)	144
US Hot Dance Club Songs (Billboard)	25

== Release history ==
Release dates and formats for "Open Your Box"
Region	Date	Format(s)	Label(s)	Cat. No.	Ref.
United Kingdom	June 24, 2002	CD; 12-inch	Mind Train	CDMIND 001; 12MIND 001	
