= Don't Stop Me! =

Don't Stop Me! EP

EP by Plastic Ono Band
- Released: 9 June 2009
- Genres: Indie pop; indie rock
- Length: 22:16
- Label: Chimera Music
- Producer: Sean Lennon

Plastic Ono Band chronology
Open Your Box (2007)	Don't Stop Me! EP (2009)	Between My Head and the Sky (2009)

Don't Stop Me! EP is an iTunes exclusive EP release by Yoko Ono's band Plastic Ono Band. The album is also available in the form of a promotional-only compact disc, leading up to her album Between My Head and the Sky, released in September 2009. It features a remix of "The Sun Is Down!" by Japanese musician Cornelius, who also features in the new Plastic Ono Band lineup on Between My Head and the Sky.

== Track listing ==
All songs written by Yoko Ono.

1. "The Sun Is Down!" (Cornelius Mix) – 4:51
2. "Ask the Elephant!" – 3:03
3. "Feel the Sand" – 6:06
4. "Calling (alternate version)" – 8:16
