= Plastic Ono Band =

English rock band and art collective

- Plastic Ono Band, 1969. L–R: Klaus Voormann, Alan White, Yoko Ono, John Lennon and Eric Clapton

Background information
- Also known as: Plastic Ono Band with Elephant's Memory; Plastic U.F. Ono Band; Plastic Ono Nuclear Band; Yoko Ono Plastic Ono Band; Elastic Oz Band
- Origin: London, England
- Genres: Rock; experimental; art rock; conceptual art; avant-garde
- Years active: 1968–1974; 2009–2015
- Labels: Apple; Chimera Music
- Members: See List of Plastic Ono Band line-ups for past members.
- Website: yopob.com

The Plastic Ono Band was an English rock band and Fluxus-based artist collective formed by John Lennon and Yoko Ono in 1968–69 for their collaborative musical and sound art projects, films, conceptual art projects and eventual solo LPs. The creation of the Plastic Ono Band, which began in 1967 with Ono's idea for an art exhibition in Berlin, allowed Lennon to separate his artistic output from that of the Beatles.

Lennon and Ono began a personal and artistic relationship in 1968, collaborating on several experimental releases. After their marriage in 1969, they decided their future endeavours would be credited to the Plastic Ono Band. The band featured a rotating line-up of musicians including Eric Clapton, Klaus Voormann, Alan White, Billy Preston, Jim Keltner, Keith Moon, Delaney & Bonnie and Friends, and Lennon's former Beatles bandmates George Harrison and Ringo Starr. After Lennon and Ono moved to New York in 1971, they collaborated with Elephant's Memory under the name "Plastic Ono Band with Elephant's Memory". Lennon's collaborations continued under similar names until 1974.

From 2009 to 2015, Ono and her son Sean Lennon led a new incarnation of the group, the Yoko Ono Plastic Ono Band.

== History ==
=== Origins and formation (1968–1969) ===
As I was asked to do a show in Berlin before John and I got together, I wanted to use four plastic stands with tape recorders in each one of them, as my band. I told that story to John, and he immediately coined the phrase PLASTIC ONO BAND.

— Yoko Ono, 2010

John Lennon and Yoko Ono met in 1966. Lennon was a member of the Beatles, and Ono was an avant-garde artist and performer. By 1968, the two established a romantic relationship and they began collaborating on a number of musical projects.

The Plastic Ono Band name, and its Fluxus idea of an open-ended plastic band, was conceived of by Ono in 1967 as an idea for an art exhibition in Berlin. The Plastic Ono Band was realized in 1968 as a multi-media machine maquette by John Lennon, also called The Plastic Ono Band. In 1968, Lennon and Ono began a personal and artistic relationship in which they decided to credit their future endeavours as the work of The Plastic Ono Band. Ono and Lennon collaborated on several art exhibitions, concerts, happenings and experimental noise music recording projects, before recording and releasing somewhat more standard rock-based albums that were still connected to the Plastic Ono Band concept.

They recorded together in May 1968; these recordings would be released in November as the experimental album Unfinished Music No.1: Two Virgins. The pair worked throughout the summer on "Revolution 9", an experimental piece that appeared on the Beatles' self-titled double album (also known as the "White Album"). In December 1968, Lennon and Ono appeared together at The Rolling Stones Rock and Roll Circus with a supergroup named "The Dirty Mac", consisting of Eric Clapton, Keith Richards of the Rolling Stones, Mitch Mitchell of the Jimi Hendrix Experience, and violinist Ivry Gitlis. Lennon and Ono continued with their experimental releases parallel to Lennon's activities in the Beatles, releasing Unfinished Music No. 2: Life with the Lions in May 1969.

On 20 March 1969, Lennon and Ono married, and subsequently hosted their first "Bed-in for Peace" event. The event saw them using press coverage of their marriage to advocate for peace. Recordings made around this time were released as their third and final experimental album, Wedding Album. The Plastic Ono Band moniker was first used on 12 May, when Lennon and Ono participated in George Harrison's mixing session for "Jam Peace" – a jam that Harrison had recorded during a session with Apple Records artist Billy Preston. The track was subsequently titled "I Remember Jeep" and the artist credit on the EMI tape box was changed to George Harrison for inclusion on the bonus disc of his 1970 solo album All Things Must Pass.

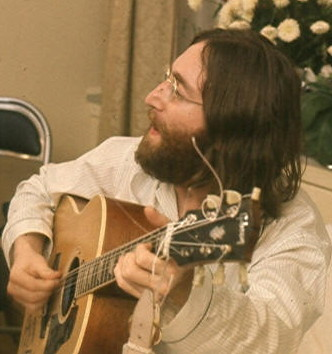
Lennon playing "Give Peace a Chance" in Montreal, 1969

During the second bed-in, held in Montreal in late May and early June 1969, Lennon, Ono and their guests recorded the Lennon-penned song "Give Peace a Chance" and Ono's "Remember Love". These were released on 4 July as a single credited to the Plastic Ono Band. It was the first single released by Lennon outside of the Beatles, with whom he was still active. Although an independent composition and release by Lennon, his Beatles writing partner Paul McCartney was still credited, as both a contractual and personal agreement of sharing credit. There is written and photographic evidence to suggest, however, that the original Plastic Ono Band was a sound and light installation set up in the Apple press office. In the 26 July 1969 edition of Disc and Music Echo, Derek Taylor, the Beatles press officer, wrote the following article:

The band was made in perspex in Hoylake, in Cheshire (where Selwyn Lloyd and I were brought up separately) by an inventor I know called Charles Melling. It was Yoko's idea, with John, made to her specifications; four pieces – like John, Paul, George and Ringo, three taller and one shorter. Two rectangular, one cylindrical and a cube. One column holds a tape-recorder and amplifier, another a closed circuit TV set with live camera, a third a record player with amplifier, and the fourth has a miniature light show and a loud speaker. But they could hold anything, they are as adaptable as the Beatles. The perspex columns were fitted with their equipment by Apple electronics under the direction of (Magic) Alexis Mardas and here ends the first and last technological press release you will have from me.

The single was preceded by a press launch for the Plastic Ono Band on 3 July. According to Ono, the name was coined by Lennon as a result of Ono's use of plastic stands for recording. Press material outlined the "band" as a conceptual movement, not limited to a strict membership like a normal group. Lennon and Ono stated that the audience were members, with the accompanying slogan "YOU are the Plastic Ono Band".

=== Toronto Rock Revival Festival and early singles (1969–1970) ===
The Plastic Ono Band remained dormant for most of the summer of 1969 as the Beatles worked on completing Abbey Road. On 12 September, Lennon received a call from John Brower, organizer of the Toronto Rock and Roll Revival festival (set to occur the following day), offering Lennon free attendance to the festival in order to boost its profile. Lennon offered instead to perform at the festival. Brower agreed, and Lennon quickly assembled a band. He initially approached Beatles bandmate George Harrison to play lead guitar, but Harrison turned him down. On Harrison's recommendation, Lennon recruited Eric Clapton for the role; bassist Klaus Voormann and drummer Alan White filled out the first performing line-up of the Plastic Ono Band. While organising the band, Lennon privately decided to leave the Beatles, due to longstanding tensions in the group. The band rehearsed on the plane to Toronto, and performed both rock songs sung by Lennon and experimental pieces led by Ono. A recording of the show was released in December as Live Peace in Toronto 1969, the first LP credited to the Plastic Ono Band.

In late September, the Plastic Ono Band began recording their next single. "Cold Turkey" had been initially presented by Lennon as a potential Beatles single, but this was rejected by McCartney. "Cold Turkey" and its B-side "Don't Worry Kyoko (Mummy's Only Looking for Her Hand in the Snow)" featured a Plastic Ono Band almost identical to the Toronto line-up except White was replaced by Beatles drummer Ringo Starr. The writing credit for "Cold Turkey" contained only Lennon's name, reflecting his split with McCartney and the Beatles.

Following the release of the "Cold Turkey" single, Lennon began preparations for a follow-up. On 26 November, he mixed "You Know My Name (Look Up the Number)" and "What's the New Mary Jane", for release as a single. Both songs were old Beatles recordings. "You Know My Name" dated initially from 1967, with further work by Lennon and McCartney in 1969. The B-side was a 1968 Lennon song recorded by him, Harrison and Ono, and originally intended for inclusion on the White Album. The single was put on hold by EMI, and was ultimately cancelled, possibly due to objections from the Beatles.

On 15 December, the Plastic Ono Band took part in a benefit concert for UNICEF at the Lyceum Ballroom in London, titled "Peace for Christmas". With 48 hours' notice, Lennon and Ono assembled the Toronto line-up of Clapton, Voormann and White; Clapton brought along Harrison, Billy Preston and the Delaney & Bonnie and Friends touring group, with whom they were touring at the time. In addition to Delaney and Bonnie Bramlett, the group included saxophonist Bobby Keys, drummer Jim Gordon and trumpet player Jim Price. Keith Moon of the Who also joined the performance. Lennon later referred to this line-up as "the Plastic Ono Supergroup". Following the Lyceum show, Lennon and Ono engaged in a media blitz and advertising campaign for peace, taking out billboards in major cities saying "WAR IS OVER! If You Want It – Happy Christmas from John & Yoko".

1970 saw the Plastic Ono Band reconvening to record another single, "Instant Karma!", that was written and recorded on January 27, 1970. Lennon, Ono, George Harrison, Klaus Voormann, Alan White and Billy Preston, along with backing vocalists recruited from a nearby pub, composed the Plastic Ono Band for the session. On Harrison's suggestion, American producer Phil Spector was hired, beginning a working relationship that extended for several years into both his and Lennon's careers. "Instant Karma!", backed with Ono's "Who Has Seen the Wind?", was released just over a week later. The single was credited to "Lennon/Ono with the Plastic Ono Band", in contrast to earlier releases, which were credited to the band alone.

=== Plastic Ono Band albums to "Happy Xmas (War Is Over)" (1970–1971) ===
During the summer of 1970, Lennon and Ono undertook primal therapy under the guidance of Arthur Janov in Los Angeles. This therapy had a great effect on Lennon's writing. In the meantime, the Beatles had publicly broken up, and the pair returned to London at the end of September to begin recording on a pair of studio albums, John Lennon/Plastic Ono Band and Yoko Ono/Plastic Ono Band. The core of the Plastic Ono Band backing the two was Klaus Voormann on bass and Ringo Starr on drums. Phil Spector co-produced Lennon's record, and he and Billy Preston played keyboards on some tracks. George Harrison contributed sitar to Ono's album. Lennon's record consisted of straightforward, stripped down rock, while Ono's featured experimental and avant-garde music. Both albums were released on 11 December. The single "Mother" / "Why" was issued, the songs coming from John Lennon and Yoko Ono respectively. In early 1971, Lennon recorded "Power to the People" with a line-up of Billy Preston, Bobby Keys, Klaus Voormann and Alan White. Ono's B-side "Open Your Box" featured Voormann and Jim Gordon. The single was released in March, with the sides credited to "John Lennon/Plastic Ono Band" and "Yoko Ono/Plastic Ono Band" respectively.

In the spring and summer of 1971, Lennon and Ono recorded their respective albums Imagine and Fly. Using the same "John Lennon/Plastic Ono Band" and "Yoko Ono/Plastic Ono Band" artist credits, the albums featured contributions from George Harrison, Nicky Hopkins, Klaus Voormann, Alan White, Jim Keltner and Jim Gordon, and Phil Spector co-produced Imagine. On 6 June, Lennon and Ono performed with Frank Zappa and the Mothers of Invention in New York City, later dubbing the collaboration "John & Yoko/Plastic Ono Band with The Mothers of Invention".

The next use of the Plastic Ono Band name was the 1971 Christmas single "Happy Xmas (War Is Over)". Credited to "John & Yoko/The Plastic Ono Band", the recording featured drummer Jim Keltner, pianist Nicky Hopkins and guitarists Hugh McCracken, Chris Osbourne (who had played on Fly), Teddy Irwin and Stuart Scharf. The B-side, "Listen, the Snow Is Falling", featured the same musicians as "Happy Xmas", with the addition of Klaus Voormann on bass. Co-produced by Phil Spector, the single was issued on 1 December.

=== Move to New York: Plastic Ono Band with Elephant's Memory (1971–1973) ===
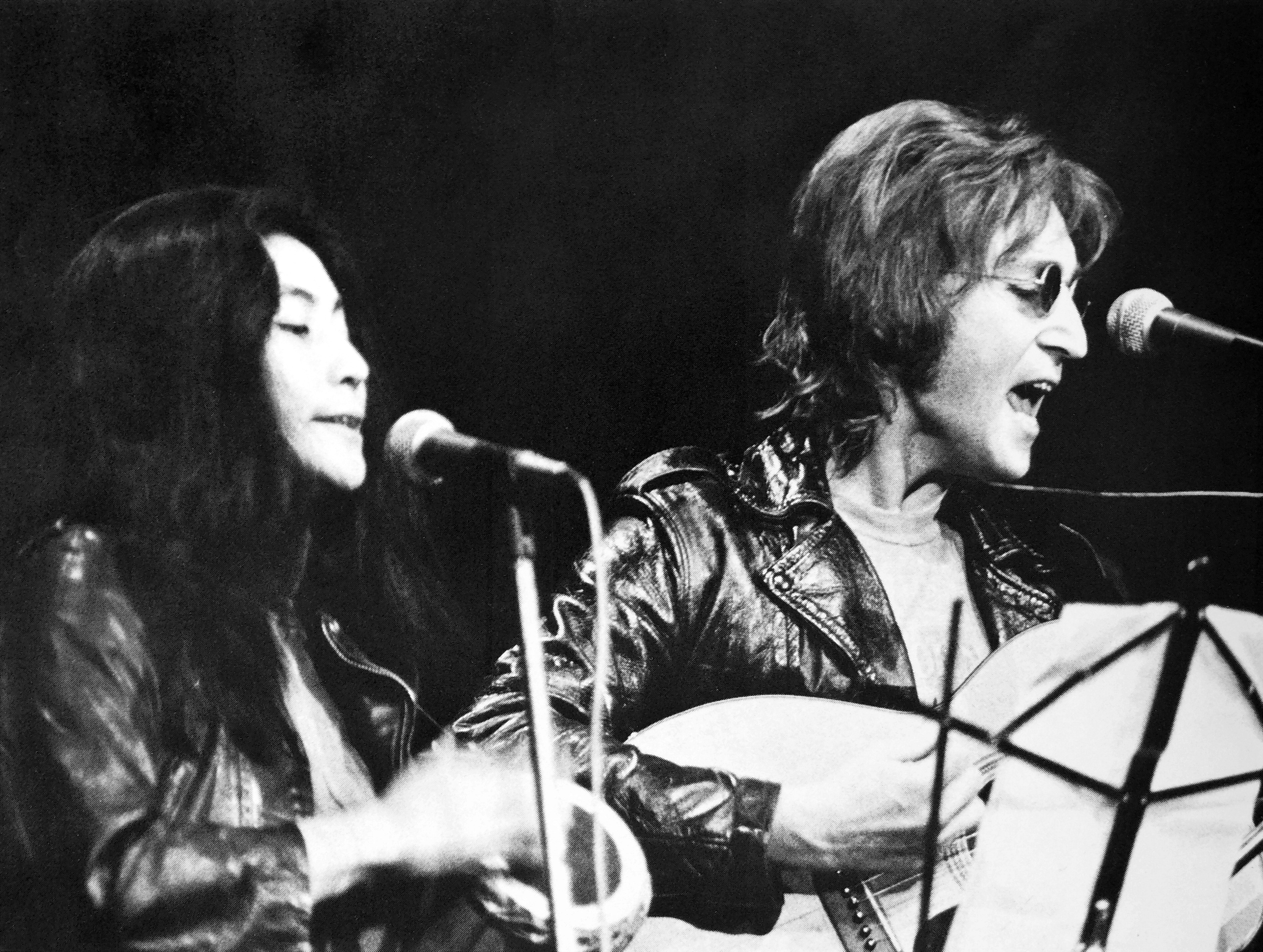
Ono and Lennon performing at a rally in December 1971

Lennon and Ono left the UK to settle in New York City during the fall of 1971. In Greenwich Village, the couple became more politically active and began writing protest songs. These songs became the basis for their next album, Some Time in New York City. As backing, they enlisted the help of New York band Elephant's Memory, consisting of guitarist Wayne 'Tex' Gabriel, bassist Gary Van Scyoc, saxophonist Stan Bronstein, keyboardist Adam Ippolito, keyboardist John La Boosca, and drummer Richard Frank Jr. Phil Spector co-produced, and Jim Keltner also played on the album. The album was released on 12 June 1972, credited to "John & Yoko/Plastic Ono Band with Elephant's Memory plus Invisible Strings". Some Time in New York City included a second disc, titled Live Jam, consisting of the recordings from the 1969 Peace for Christmas concert and, with bass overdubs by Klaus Voormann, the 1971 performance with Frank Zappa.

Ono and Lennon continued to work with Elephant's Memory throughout 1972. On 30 August, as the Plastic Ono Elephant's Memory Band (which also included Jim Keltner), they performed two "One to One" benefit concerts at Madison Square Garden. The event was organised by Geraldo Rivera to raise money for children with mental challenges. By this time, La Boosca had left Elephant's Memory, and the concerts saw the addition of John Ward on bass. The shows were filmed and recorded, and released in February 1986 as the album Live in New York City. They also performed at the Jerry Lewis MDA Labor Day Telethon.

The last collaboration between the Plastic Ono Band and Elephant's Memory was Ono's double album Approximately Infinite Universe. It was recorded throughout the fall of 1972, and was released in January 1973.

=== Lennon's split with Ono and the Lost Weekend (1973–1974) ===
By the beginning of 1973, recording had begun on Ono's next album, Feeling the Space, featuring a new group of studio musicians. This incarnation of the Plastic Ono Band featured guitarist David Spinozza, keyboardist Ken Ascher, bassist Gordon Edwards, percussionists Arthur Jenkins and David Friedman, saxophonist Michael Brecker, pedal steel guitarist Sneaky Pete Kleinow, as well as regular contributor Jim Keltner. The album was released in November.

Throughout 1973, Lennon and Ono's relationship became strained. By August, the two had begun a period of separation that Lennon called "the Lost Weekend". Lennon recorded Mind Games, using the same players as on Feeling the Space, dubbed "the Plastic U.F.Ono Band". Around the time of the album's release in November, Lennon moved to Los Angeles with new lover May Pang. In October, Lennon began the recording of an album of rock 'n' roll oldies (a contractual obligation due to a lawsuit). The sessions featured many Plastic Ono Band regulars (including much of the "U.F.Ono Band", Klaus Voormann, and Phil Spector as producer), but when released in 1975 as Rock 'n' Roll, the album was credited to Lennon alone.

The sessions for Rock 'n' Roll were extremely troubled and were abandoned until a later date. In July 1974, Lennon returned to New York to record Walls and Bridges. The new "Plastic Ono Nuclear Band" featured Jim Keltner, Kenneth Ascher and Arthur Jenkins continuing from Mind Games, the returns of Klaus Voormann, Nicky Hopkins and Bobby Keys, and the addition of guitarists Jesse Ed Davis and Eddie Mottau. Recording was completed in August, and the album was released in September.

Walls and Bridges was the last release of new material by the Plastic Ono Band in the 1970s. Lennon subsequently returned to his marriage with Ono and retired from music following the birth of his son Sean in October 1975. That same month, Lennon issued the compilation Shaved Fish, his last release to be credited to the Plastic Ono Band.

=== Revival (2009–2015) ===
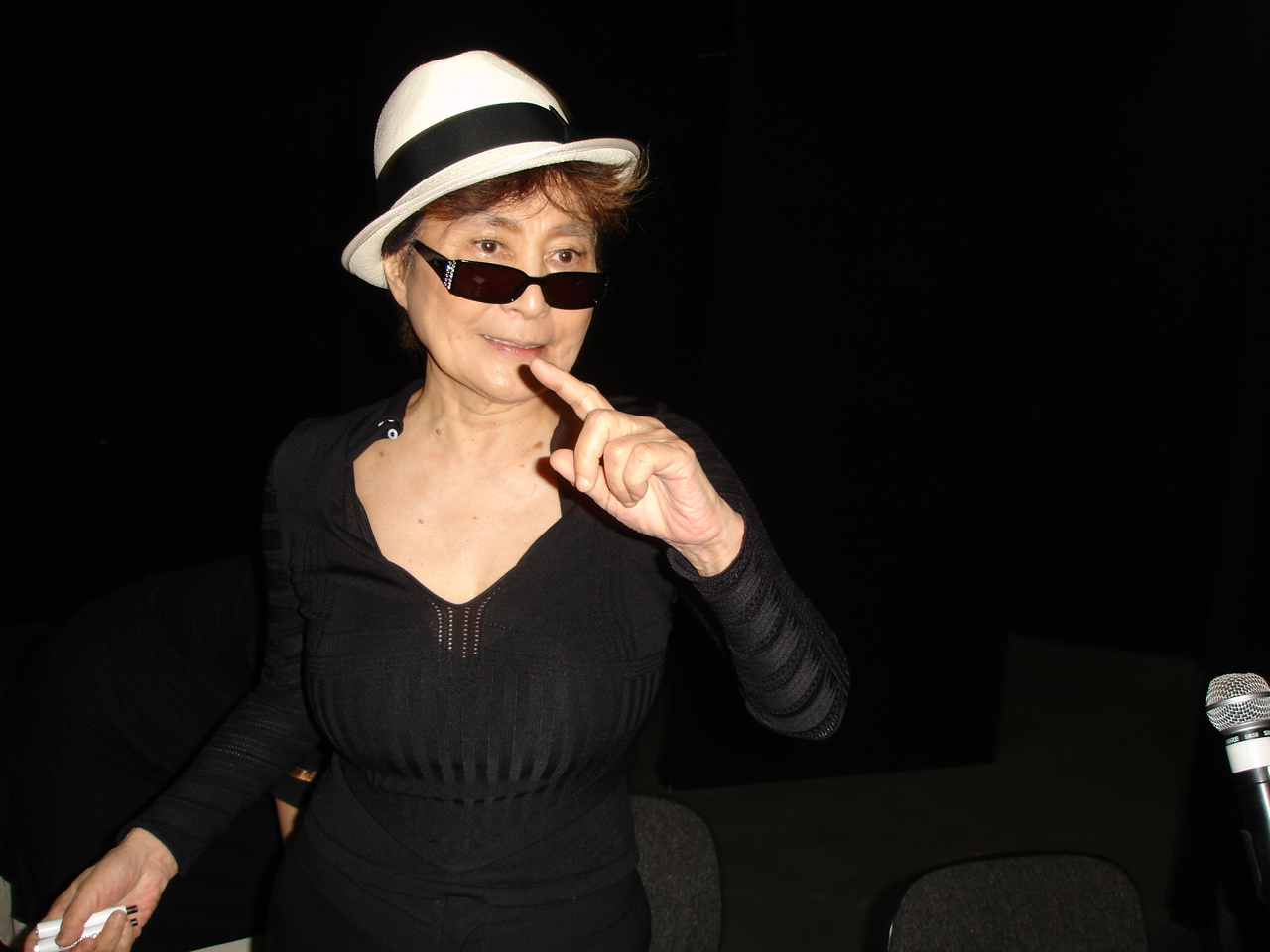
Ono in 2010

In 2009, Yoko Ono revived the Plastic Ono Band name with the 2009 EP Don't Stop Me!, a preview of the album Between My Head and the Sky. Both albums, and subsequent activities, are credited to the "Yoko Ono Plastic Ono Band". The core members of the new Plastic Ono Band were Sean Lennon (the son of Ono and Lennon), Cornelius (Keigo Oyamada) and Yuka Honda. From 2009, the band performed live concerts, with additional members including bassist Shimmy Hirotaka Shimizu, horn player Michael Leonhart, cellist Erik Friedlander and drummer Yuko Araki. They also performed with many guest performers, including Kim Gordon, Thurston Moore, Bette Midler, Lady Gaga, Mark Ronson, Scissor Sisters, Harper Simon, Paul Simon and Gene Ween.

In 2010, at a concert titled "We Are the Plastic Ono Band", Ono and Sean Lennon reunited with Eric Clapton, Klaus Voormann and Jim Keltner. In 2011, Ono and Lennon collaborated with the Flaming Lips on an EP entitled The Flaming Lips with Yoko Ono/Plastic Ono Band. The latest release from the Yoko Ono Plastic Ono Band is the 2013 album Take Me to the Land of Hell. The Yoko Ono Plastic Ono Band continued to make live appearances into 2015.

== Discography ==
Studio albums

- John Lennon/Plastic Ono Band (1970)
- Yoko Ono/Plastic Ono Band (1970)
- Some Time in New York City (1972)
- Feeling the Space (1973) (with Plastic Ono Band as backing band)
- Between My Head and the Sky (2009)
- Take Me to the Land of Hell (2013)

Live albums

- Live Peace in Toronto 1969 (1969)
- Let's Have a Dream: 1974 One Step Festival (2022)

EPs

- Don't Stop Me! (2009)
- The Flaming Lips with Yoko Ono/Plastic Ono Band (2011)

Compilations

- Shaved Fish (1975)
