= Between My Head and the Sky =

Studio album by Plastic Ono Band
- Released: 21 September 2009
- Genres: Art rock; experimental rock; avant-pop
- Length: 58:32
- Label: Chimera Music
- Producers: Yoko Ono and Sean Lennon

Plastic Ono Band chronology
Don't Stop Me! EP (2009)	Between My Head and the Sky (2009)	Onomix (2012)

Between My Head and the Sky is an album by Yoko Ono's band Plastic Ono Band released on Chimera Music in September 2009. It is her first studio album to be released as "Yoko Ono/Plastic Ono Band" since 1973's Feeling the Space. This Plastic Ono Band lineup featured Cornelius, Yuka Honda (of Cibo Matto fame), and Ono's son Sean Lennon as band leader and producer.

== Reception ==
Professional ratings
Aggregate scores
Source	Rating
Metacritic	83/100
Review scores
Source	Rating
AllMusic	4/5 stars
The A.V. Club	B+
Mojo	4/5 stars
The Observer	4/5 stars
Pitchfork	7.3/10
Q	4/5 stars
Rolling Stone	4/5 stars
Spin	4/5 stars
The Telegraph	5/5 stars
Uncut	5/5 stars

Between My Head and the Sky was met with "universal acclaim" reviews from critics. At Metacritic, which assigns a weighted average rating out of 100 to reviews from mainstream publications, this release received an average score of 83, based on 11 reviews.

New Internationalist magazine described the album as "fresh and challenging as any of her early work" and having "a commitment to spontaneity".

== Track listing ==
All songs written by Yoko Ono.

1. "Waiting for the D Train" – 2:46
2. "The Sun Is Down!" (Cornelius Mix) – 4:49
3. "Ask the Elephant!" – 2:57
4. "Memory of Footsteps" – 3:30
5. "Moving Mountains" – 3:00
6. "Calling" – 4:19
7. "Healing" – 4:25
8. "Hashire, Hashire" – 3:35
9. "Between My Head and the Sky" – 5:33
10. "Feel the Sand" – 6:02
11. "Watching the Rain" – 5:30
12. "Unun. To" – 3:16
13. "I'm Going Away Smiling" – 2:53
14. "Higa Noboru" – 5:44
15. "I'm Alive" – 0:22

Japanese bonus track

16. "Hanako" – 1:54

Japanese iTunes bonus video

17. "Why" (Live at Royal Festival Hall, London 2009) – 5:08

Note

Digital and streaming editions of the album omit the last two tracks, instead ending the album with the track "I'm Going Away Smiling".

== Personnel ==
- Yoko Ono – vocals
- Sean Lennon – acoustic and electric guitars, piano, keyboards, bass guitar, drums, percussion
- Keigo Oyamada – guitars, bass guitar, Tenorion, programming, percussion
- Hirotaka Shimizu – guitars, percussion
- Yuko Araki – drums, percussion
- Shahzad Ismaily – guitars, bass guitar, drums, percussion
- Yuka Honda – Pro-tools editing, sampler, e. piano, organ, percussion
- Michael Leonhart – trumpet, vibraphone, percussion
- Erik Friedlander – cello
- Daniel Carter – tenor saxophone, flute
- Indigo Street – guitar

Technical

- Chief Engineer: Christopher Allen
- Assistant Engineer: Dave Schoenwetter
- Recorded & Mixed at Sear Sound
- Mastered by Greg Calbi at Sterling Sound
- Mixer of "Waiting for the D Train": Joel Hamilton
- Cover and booklet design: Sean Lennon and Charlotte Kemp Muhl
- Photographs: Greg Kadel

== Release history ==
Country	Date	Format	Label	Catalog	Ref.
Japan	16 September 2009	CD	Chimera Music	PVCP-8259	
Japan	22 September 2009	2xLP	Chimera Music	616892049760	
United States	21 September 2009	CD	Chimera Music	616892056362	
United States	22 September 2009	2xLP	Chimera Music	CHIM01LP	
