= Woman Power (song) =

Single by Yoko Ono

from the album Feeling the Space
- Released: 24 September 1973
- Genre: Avant-garde; experimental rock
- Label: Apple
- Songwriter(s): Yoko Ono
- Producer(s): John Lennon, Yoko Ono

Yoko Ono singles chronology
"Josejoi Banzai" (1973)	"Woman Power" (1973)	"Run, Run, Run" (1973)

"Woman Power"

Single by Yoko Ono
- Released: 20 March 2015
- Genre: Dance
- Label: Mind Train / Twisted
- Songwriter(s): Yoko Ono
- Producer(s): Yoko Ono

Yoko Ono singles chronology
"Angel" (2014)	"Woman Power" (2015)

"Woman Power" is a single released by Yoko Ono. It was originally released on 24 September 1973 through Apple. John Lennon played guitar on the track in a performance that Ken Bielen and Ben Urish described as, "especially gritty". Bielen and Urish described Lennon's rhythm guitar solo as prefiguring his guitar playing on his last creative work, Ono's "Walking on Thin Ice". Lennon uses the alias "John O'Cean" for the song, possibly in reference to Ono's name translating as "Ocean Child" in Japanese. A remix version was released on 26 August 2014 through Mind Train / Twisted. It reached number six on Billboard's Hot Dance Club Play chart.

In 2018 Refinery29 contributor Courtney E. Smith claimed that "the immediacy and relevance of the song is startling" and stated that "Ono's call out to then-President Richard Nixon in the track to find his humanity...is just as applicable to current President Donald Trump." According to Ono, the original version of the song was "very confrontational to guys" telling men that "We'll teach you how to cook, we'll teach you how to knit." Looking back on the song in 2015 she felt men had learned these things and she was writing a new version about men and women getting together that she planned to sing at the Modern Sky Festival that year.

A revised version of the song was released on Warzone in 2018. According to Pitchfork, this version "loses its sense of spontaneous play" as the "roaring electric guitars" and "commanding drumbeat" that gave the original version urgency fade behind Ono's voice in the 2nd half of the revised version and are eventually replaced by string instruments. Although an electric guitar returns at the end with what Pitchfork says that "it feels as though two visions of the future are competing: one in which women have already seized the power afforded to men, and one in which Ono mourns that power's lack."

== Track listing ==
Remixes Part 1

1. "Woman Power" (Alyson Calagna Vocal Mix) – 5:43
2. "Woman Power" (Alyson Calagna Dub) – 5:40
3. "Woman Power" (Dave Audé Radio Edit) – 3:35
4. "Woman Power" (Dave Audé Club Mix) – 5:36
5. "Woman Power" (Dave Audé Dub) – 5:38
6. "Woman Power" (Dave Audé Instrumental) – 5:36
7. "Woman Power" (Mike Cruz Power Mix) – 5:47
8. "Woman Power" (Mike Cruz Power Dub) – 8:53
9. "Woman Power" (Twisted Dee Anthem Mix) – 7:37
10. "Woman Power" (Twisted Dee Dub) – 7:37

Remixes Part 2

1. "Woman Power" (Pagano Club Mix; featuring Yoko Ono) – 5:42
2. "Woman Power" (Tracy Young Club Mix; featuring Yoko Ono) – 7:00
3. "Woman Power" (Ben Manson & Gerald Henderson Mix; featuring Yoko Ono) – 5:34
4. "Woman Power" (JamLimmat & Dani Vars Mix; featuring Yoko Ono) – 6:04
5. "Woman Power" (Severino & Terry Farley Mix; featuring Yoko Ono) – 6:18
6. "Woman Power" (Rosabel Club Mix; featuring Yoko Ono) – 7:02
7. "Woman Power" (Bojan Club Mix; featuring Yoko Ono) – 6:10
8. "Woman Power" (Fagault & Marina Mix; featuring Yoko Ono) – 4:15

== Charts ==
Chart (2015)	Peak position
US Dance Club Songs (Billboard)	6
