= Take Me to the Land of Hell =

Studio album by Plastic Ono Band
- Released: 17 September 2013
- Recorded: 2012–2013
- Genres: Art rock; electronic; indie rock
- Length: 42:47
- Label: Chimera Music
- Producers: Yoko Ono; Sean Lennon; Yuka C. Honda

Plastic Ono Band chronology
Yokokimthurston (2012)	Take Me to the Land of Hell (2013)	Yes, I'm a Witch Too (2016)

Take Me to the Land of Hell (stylized in all caps) is the sixth and final studio album by Yoko Ono's band Plastic Ono Band. It is her fifteenth solo album overall and Ono's second since reforming the Plastic Ono Band in 2009 with her son Sean Lennon. It features guests Yuka C Honda, Keigo "Cornelius" Oyamada, Hirotaka "Shimmy" Shimizu, Yuko Araki, Nels Cline, Tune-Yards, Questlove, Ad-Rock & Mike D, Michael Leonhart, Bill Dobrow, Jared Samuel, Shahzad Ismaily, Lenny Kravitz, Andrew Wyatt, Erik Friedlander, Lois Martin, Joyce Hammann, Thomas Bartlett, Douglas Wieselman, Julian Lage, Toyoaki Mishima, Toru Takayama, Christopher Sean Powell, Christopher Allen, Andre Kellman, Michael H. Brauer, Bob Ludwig, Kevin Harper, Mark Bengston, Geoff Thorpe and Greg Kadel.

== Background ==
The album was produced by Sean Lennon. Throughout the fall of 2012 he posted on social media about recording the album with Cline, Lage, Cornelius, tUnE-yArDs and Kravitz. In early 2013 Lennon announced the album was ready to be mixed, and that it would be released that year to tie in with Ono's 80th birthday. In June 2013 the lead single "Moonbeams" was released as a free download for pre-order customers. Every Monday an additional new track was streamed for free starting in August, leading up to its 17 September 2013 release.

== Reception ==
Professional ratings
Aggregate scores
Source	Rating
Metacritic	79/100
Review scores
Source	Rating
AllMusic	4/5 stars
Cuepoint (Expert Witness)	A−
The Guardian	4/5 stars
Mojo	4/5 stars
Pitchfork	7/10
PopMatters	7/10
Q	4/5 stars
Rolling Stone	3/5 stars
The Sunday Times	Positive
Uncut	4/5 stars
The Wire	4/5 stars

British newspaper The Sunday Times gave a positive review of the album, stating that over her career Yoko has "ruthlessly [pursued] her own vision" and on this album "no one outshines Yoko" from the guest list. The paper additionally noted the "stunning chorus" of "7th Floor" and felt that Yoko was a "pretty balladeer" on "There's No Goodbye Between Us".

== Track listing ==
All lyrics are written by Yoko Ono.

No.	Title	Length
1.	"Moonbeams"	5:48
2.	"Cheshire Cat Cry"	4:58
3.	"Tabetai"	2:45
4.	"Bad Dancer"	3:11
5.	"Little Boy Blue Your Daddy's Gone"	3:47
6.	"There's No Goodbye Between Us"	2:42
7.	"7th Floor"	3:06
8.	"N.Y. Noodle Town"	3:15
9.	"Take Me to the Land of Hell"	3:24
10.	"Watching the Dawn"	2:48
11.	"Leaving Tim"	2:49
12.	"Shine, Shine"	4:01
13.	"Hawk's Call"	0:15

Japan bonus track
No.	Title	Length
14.	"Story of an Oak Tree"	4:33

Japan bonus disc (CD edition only)
No.	Title	Length
1.	"Ai"	2:56

== Personnel ==
- Yoko Ono – vocals (all tracks except 13)
- Sean Ono Lennon – acoustic guitar (8), bass (1, 2, 6, 7, 14), conductor (11), drum machine (5), drum programming (1), electric guitar (2, 3), guitar (1, 9, 14), kalimba (5), keyboards (14), percussion (8, 12, 14), piano (3, 6, 9, 10), shakers (5), sound design (14), synthesizer (1, 2, 3, 5, 6, 7), vocals (6)
- Adam Horovitz – additional beats, programming and "other curve balls" (4)
- Andrew Wyatt – Rhodes (8)
- Bill Dubrow – drums (11), percussion (1, 7, 11)
- Christopher Sean Powell – percussion (1)
- Erik Friedlander – cello (9, 10), string arrangement (10)
- Hirotaka "Shimmy" Shimizu – electric guitar (1, 6, 7, 8, 12), guitars (14)
- Jared Samuel – B3 (7, 8), percussion (8), synthesizer (7)
- Joyce Hammann – violin (10)
- Julian Lage – acoustic guitar (11)
- Keigo Oyamada – bass (12), electric guitar (7, 12), iPad (14), Kaoss synthesizer (1), synthesizer (12)
- Kevin Harper – bottle (3)
- Lenny Kravitz – drums (2), Clavinet (2)
- Lois Martin – viola (10)
- Merrill Garbus – bottle (3), drums (3, 5), percussion (3, 5), Rhodes (5), voice (3, 5)
- Michael Leonhart – Mellophones (6), percussion (8)
- Mike D – additional beats, programming and "other curve balls" (4)
- Nate Brenner – bass (3, 5), bottle (3), percussion (3), voice (5)
- Nels Cline – electric guitar (1, 6, 7, 8), guitars (14), lap steel (8), loops (6), percussion (8)
- Questlove – drums (7)
- Shahzad Ismaily – acoustic guitar (8), bass (8), guitar (14), percussion (8), sound design (14)
- Thomas Bartlett – piano (11)
- Toyoaki Mishima – manipulator (12)
- Yuka C. Honda – BW piano loops (6), keyboards (8, 14), Rhodes (1, 6), sampler (1, 5), sound design (14), synthesizer (5, 6), additional drum programming (14)
- Yuko Araki – drums (1, 6, 8, 12, 14), percussion (12, 14), synthesizer (3)
- "Bad Dancer" remixed by Adam Horowitz and Mike D
- "Shine, Shine" remixed by Cornelius

Technical personnel

- Recorded at Sear Sound by Christopher Allen
- Mixed by Michael H. Brauer for MHB Prods
- Mixed at Electric Lady Studios
- Mastered by Bob Ludwig at Gateway Mastering
- Kevin Harper – Assistant Engineer
- Mark Bengston – Pro Tools Engineer and Assistant
- Geoff Thorpe – Art Director
- Greg Kadel – Cover Photography
- Sean Ono Lennon – Studio Photos
- Yoko Ono – Drawings
- Andre Kellman – Mix Engineer at Oscilloscope Laboratories (4)
- Toru Takayama – Additional Engineer (12)

== Release history ==
Country	Date	Format	Label	Catalog	Ref.
Japan	12 September 2013	2xCD	Chimera Music	XQJQ-1010	
United States	17 September 2013	CD	Chimera Music		
United States	17 September 2013	2xLP	Chimera Music		
