= Hell in Paradise =

Single by Yoko Ono

from the album Starpeace
- Released: 14 October 1985
- Recorded: 1984
- Genre: Rock; dance-rock; new wave
- Label: Polydor
- Songwriter: Yoko Ono
- Producer: Yoko Ono

Yoko Ono singles chronology
"Never Say Goodbye" (1983)	"Hell in Paradise" (1985)	"Cape Clear" (1985)
"Will I" / "Fly" (2003)	"Hell in Paradise" (2004)	"Everyman... Everywoman..." (2004)

Music video
- "Hell in Paradise" at YouTube

"Hell in Paradise" is a song by Yoko Ono from the 1985 album Starpeace. The lyrics are about mankind's perceived idea of hell, despite living in the paradise that Ono considers to be planet Earth. After "Walking on Thin Ice", it was her biggest hit of the 1980s, charting at number 16 on the US dance chart. Ono went on hiatus after Starpeace; this would be her last proper single until 2001's remix of "Open Your Box".

Ultimate Classic Rock critic Michael Gallucci rated it as Ono's 4th best song, calling it the "highlight" of Starpeace.

In 2004, the track was revived as part of the ONO remix project, and reached number 4 on the same chart twenty years on. In 2016, the song was re-released by the ONO project again, featuring remixes by Dave Audé and others. It reached number 1 on the Dance Club Songs chart.

== Music video ==
The video was directed by Polish filmmaker Zbigniew Rybczyński. It stars Ono alongside Michael J. Anderson, Peter Risch, Daniel Richards, and Christopher Greener. The music video won the award "Most Innovative Video" at Billboard Music Video Awards in 1986.

== Reception ==
John Leland at Spin said the song was as, "banal as its title, and Ono's exhortation to "exorcise institutions" only underscores the extent to which the ensemble sounds reined in. Part preachy, part self-help soundpiece about what a shithole we've turned the world into."

== Track listing ==
US 7" single

1. "Hell in Paradise"
2. "Hell in Paradise" (Instrumental)

US 12" single

A1. "Hell in Paradise" (Club Version) – 6:52
B1. "Hell in Paradise" (Dub Version) – 8:52
B2. "Hell in Paradise" (Single Version) – 3:34

12" single (2004)

A1. "Hell in Paradise" (Murk Miami Mix)
A2. "Hell in Paradise" (Orange Factory "Hot As..." Mix)
B1. "Hell in Paradise" (Chus & Ceballos Iberican Mix)
B2. "Hell in Paradise" (Minge Binge Club Mix)

Digital download (2004)

1. "Hell in Paradise" (Murk Miami Mix) – 8:11
2. "Hell in Paradise" (Orange Factory "Hot As..." Mix) – 7:45
3. "Hell in Paradise" (Chus & Ceballos Iberican Mix) – 10:07
4. "Hell in Paradise" (Minge Binge Club Mix) – 7:18
5. "Hell in Paradise" (Chris the Greek Club Mix) – 6:55
6. "Hell in Paradise" (Chris the Greek Radio Edit) – 3:53

== Charts ==
Chart (1985)	Peak position
US Hot Dance Club Songs (Billboard)	12
US Hot Dance Singles Sales (Billboard)	16
Chart (2004)	Peak position
US Dance Club Songs (Billboard)	4
Chart (2016–17)	Peak position
US Dance Club Songs (Billboard)	1
