= Feeling the Space =

Studio album by Yoko Ono (Note: With Plastic Ono Band and Something Different as backing bands.)
- Released: 2 November 1973
- Recorded: 1972 – June 1973
- Genre: Pop rock
- Length: 44:48
- Label: Apple
- Producer: Yoko Ono

Yoko Ono chronology
| Approximately Infinite Universe (1973) | Feeling the Space (1973) | Double Fantasy (1980) |

Singles from Feeling the Space
- 1. "Woman Power" Released: 24 September 1973 (US); 2. "Run, Run, Run" Released: 9 October 1973 (UK)

Feeling the Space is the fourth studio album by Japanese musician Yoko Ono, released in 1973. It was her last one to be released on Apple Records.

== Background ==
The entire album adopts a feminist theme, focusing on issues affecting women in the 1970s. Its liner notes parody adult advertising, giving the telephone numbers, birthdates and vital statistics of the male band members. (John Lennon appears as "John O'Cean", with his number listed as "Not for Sale"). Lennon played guitar on the tracks "Woman Power" and "She Hits Back", and sings a backing vocal line on "Men, Men, Men". Lennon's album, Mind Games, was released around the same time as Feeling the Space, in November 1973.

The album was originally planned to be a double until EMI/Apple demanded it be edited. The entire released album, plus the songs originally intended for the double release, is included as the "Run, Run, Run" disc on the Onobox set. The five extra songs included on Onobox were later added as bonus tracks to the 2017 reissue of Feeling the Space.

== Reception ==
Professional ratings
Review scores
| Source | Rating |
|---|---|
| AllMusic | 2/5 stars |
| Pitchfork | 7.0/10 |
| Rolling Stone | (not rated) |

Upon release, Billboard called Feeling the Space Yoko's "most commercial LP yet" and also considered it to be her best so far, noting the "often melodic set of tunes" and that Yoko's "singing is excellent".

== Track listing ==
All songs written by Yoko Ono.

Side one
| No. | Title | Length |
|---|---|---|
| 1. | "Growing Pain" | 3:50 |
| 2. | "Yellow Girl (Stand By for Life)" | 3:13 |
| 3. | "Coffin Car" | 3:29 |
| 4. | "Woman of Salem" | 3:09 |
| 5. | "Run, Run, Run" | 5:07 |
| 6. | "If Only" | 3:40 |

Side two
| No. | Title | Length |
|---|---|---|
| 7. | "A Thousand Times Yes" | 3:00 |
| 8. | "Straight Talk" | 2:50 |
| 9. | "Angry Young Woman" | 3:51 |
| 10. | "She Hits Back" | 3:48 |
| 11. | "Woman Power" | 4:50 |
| 12. | "Men, Men, Men" | 4:01 |

1997 reissue bonus tracks
| No. | Title | Length |
|---|---|---|
| 13. | "I Learned to Stutter/Coffin Car" (Live) | 6:51 |
| 14. | "Mildred, Mildred" (Demo) | 3:36 |

2017 reissue bonus tracks
| No. | Title | Length |
|---|---|---|
| 13. | "I Learned to Stutter/Coffin Car" (Live) | 6:53 |
| 14. | "Potbelly Rocker" | 2:41 |
| 15. | "It's Been Very Hard" | 6:01 |
| 16. | "Warrior Woman" | 5:02 |
| 17. | "Left Turn's the Right Turn" | 2:13 |
| 18. | "Mildred, Mildred" | 2:58 |
| 19. | "Mildred, Mildred" (Demo) | 3:42 |

== Personnel ==
- Yoko Ono – vocals, backing vocals
- David Spinozza – acoustic guitar
- Ken Ascher – piano, Hammond organ, mellotron on "Growing Pain"
- Gordon Edwards – bass guitar
- Jim Keltner – drums
- Michael Brecker – saxophone
- Arthur Jenkins Jr. – percussion
- David Friedman – vibraphone
- Sneaky Pete Kleinow – pedal steel guitar
- John O'Cean (John Lennon) – guitar on "She Hits Back" and "Woman Power"
- Don Frank Brooks – harmonica
- Jeremy Steig – flute
- Andrew Smith – drums on "Growing Pain"
- Robert "Bob Babbitt" Kreinar – bass guitar on "Growing Pain"
- Rick Marotta – drums on "If Only"
- Something Different Chorus on "Run, Run, Run", "Straight Talk", "Angry Young Woman", "She Hits Back" and "Women Power"

Technical

- George Marino – mastering engineer

== Release history ==
| Country | Date | Format | Label | Catalog | Ref. |
|---|---|---|---|---|---|
| United States | 2 November 1973 | LP; 8-track | Apple Records | SW-3412; 8XW 3412 | |
| United Kingdom | 16 November 1973 | LP | Apple Records | SAPCOR 26 | |
| Japan | 1973 | LP | Apple Records | EAP-80921 | |
| Germany | 1973 | LP | Apple Records | 1C062-94963 | |
| France | 1973 | LP | Apple Records | 2C064-96963 | |
| United States | January 1974 | Cassette | Apple Records | 4XW 3412 | |
| United States | 10 June 1997 | CD | Rykodisc | RCD 10419 | |
| Japan | 23 July 1997 | CD | Rykodisc | VACK-5375 | |
| United Kingdom | 18 August 1997 | CD | Rykodisc | RCD 10419 | |
| Japan | 24 January 2007 | CD | Rykodisc, Apple Records | VACK-1311 | |
| United States & Europe | 14 July 2017 | LP; LP (White); CD | Secretly Canadian; Chimera Music | SC284; CHIM23 | |
| Japan | 2 August 2017 | CD | Sony Records International | SICX-88 | |
| Japan | 9 August 2017 | LP (White) | Sony Records International | SIJP-53 | |
