= Walking on Thin Ice (album) =

Greatest hits album by Yoko Ono
- Released: 7 May 1992
- Recorded: 1971–85
- Genres: Rock; experimental; art pop; avant-garde
- Length: 71:09
- Label: Rykodisc
- Producer: Yoko Ono

Yoko Ono chronology
| Onobox (1992) | Walking on Thin Ice (1992) | New York Rock (1994) |

Professional ratings
Review scores
| Source | Rating |
|---|---|
| AllMusic | 4.5/5 stars |
| Calgary Herald | B− |
| Robert Christgau | A |
| Rolling Stone | (not rated) |

Walking on Thin Ice is a greatest-hits compilation of Yoko Ono's work from 1971-85. It was released by Rykodisc in 1992, along with the more comprehensive 6-disc Onobox set.

== Background ==
Walking on Thin Ice includes 19 songs from the Onobox set and serves as a "best-of" selection of songs from the set. Several songs are included as the remixed versions from the box set.

The booklet includes an essay by Ono, pieces from her book Grapefruit, and quotes about her from artists such as David Bowie, Eric Clapton and Cyndi Lauper.

The compilation was initially planned for release in the United Kingdom on 6 April 1992 before being pushed back to 18 May.

== Track listing ==
Walking on Thin Ice: Compilation
| No. | Title | Album | Length |
|---|---|---|---|
| 1. | "Walking on Thin Ice" | Non-album single | 6:00 |
| 2. | "Even When You're Far Away" (Edit) | Season of Glass (1981) | 4:12 |
| 3. | "Kiss Kiss Kiss" | Double Fantasy (1980) | 2:40 |
| 4. | "Nobody Sees Me Like You Do" | Season of Glass (1981) | 3:33 |
| 5. | "Yang Yang" (Remix) | Approximately Infinite Universe (1973) | 3:48 |
| 6. | "No, No, No" (Edit) | Season of Glass (1981) | 2:41 |
| 7. | "Death of Samantha" (Remix) | Approximately Infinite Universe (1973) | 5:05 |
| 8. | "Mindweaver" (Edit) | Season of Glass (1981) | 3:27 |
| 9. | "You're the One" (Extended version) | Milk and Honey (1984) | 4:26 |
| 10. | "Spec of Dust" | It's Alright (I See Rainbows) (1982) | 3:32 |
| 11. | "Midsummer New York" (Edit) | Fly (1971) | 2:15 |
| 12. | "Don't Be Scared" (Extended version) | Milk and Honey (1984) | 3:51 |
| 13. | "Sleepless Night" (Extended version) | Milk and Honey (1984) | 3:52 |
| 14. | "Kite Song" (Remix) | Approximately Infinite Universe (1973) | 2:48 |
| 15. | "She Gets Down on Her Knees" | Season of Glass (1981) | 4:10 |
| 16. | "Give Me Something" | Double Fantasy (1981) | 1:34 |
| 17. | "Hell in Paradise" (Remix) | Starpeace (1985) | 3:38 |
| 18. | "Woman Power" (Remix) | Feeling the Space (1973) | 5:36 |
| 19. | "O'Oh" | Onobox (1992) | 4:01 |
| Total length: | | | 71:21 |

== Release history ==
| Country | Date | Format | Label | Catalog | Ref. |
|---|---|---|---|---|---|
| United States | 7 May 1992 | CD; Cassette | Rykodisc | RCD 20230; RCS 20230 | |
| United Kingdom | 18 May 1992 | CD | Rykodisc | RCD 20230 | |
| Japan | 25 May 1994 | CD | Rykodisc | VACK 1003 | |
| Japan | 25 August 1996 | CD | Rykodisc | VACK-5319 | |
