= Yes, I'm a Witch =

Remix album by Yoko Ono
- Released: February 6, 2007
- Recorded: 2006
- Length: 63:03
- Labels: Astralwerks; Apple

Yoko Ono chronology
Blueprint for a Sunrise (2001)	Yes, I'm a Witch (2007)	Open Your Box (2007)

Yes, I'm a Witch is a remix album by Yoko Ono released on February 6, 2007 by Apple Records and Astralwerks. Artists invited to contribute were asked to select a song from Ono's back catalogue, and were then presented with all the necessary elements to create a remix or cover version. According to the press release, nearly every artist retained only Ono's vocals and created entirely new backing tracks.

The song choices span Ono's career from her early experimental work with John Lennon in the late 1960s through to her more conventional pop-rock solo career in the 1970s and 1980s. The album draws its title from a 1974 Ono song featured on her album A Story, a track which is featured on the album in a reworked version by the Brother Brothers.

A follow-up compilation of dance remixes, Open Your Box, was released on April 24.

In July 2015, Pitchfork announced a sequel to Yes, I'm a Witch—titled Yes, I'm a Witch Too—with collaborations and remixes from Miike Snow, Portugal. The Man, Death Cab for Cutie, Penguin Prison, Peter Bjorn and John, Tune-Yards, Moby and others, released on February 19, 2016 on Manimal Vinyl.

Professional ratings
Aggregate scores
Source	Rating
Metacritic	76/100
Review scores
Source	Rating
AllMusic	3.5/5 stars
Blender	3.5/5 stars
The Guardian	4/5 stars
Mojo	4/5 stars
NME	6/10 stars
Pitchfork	7.4/10
Rolling Stone	3.5/5 stars

== Track listing ==
All tracks are written by Yoko Ono.

No.	Title	Artist(s)	Length
1.	"Witch Shocktronica Intro"	Hank Shocklee	1:47
2.	"Kiss Kiss Kiss"	Peaches	3:18
3.	"O'Oh"	Shitake Monkey	3:38
4.	"Everyman Everywoman" (first released in 2004 as "Everyman Everywoman (Blow-Up Radio Edit)")	Blow-Up	4:01
5.	"Sisters, O Sisters"	Le Tigre	2:47
6.	"Death of Samantha" (first released in 2003 on the "Will I"/"Fly" remix single)	Porcupine Tree	4:35
7.	"Rising"	DJ Spooky	4:13
8.	"Nobody Sees Me Like You Do"	The Apples in Stereo	3:56
9.	"Yes, I'm a Witch"	The Brother Brothers	3:48
10.	"Revelations"	Cat Power	3:52
11.	"You and I"	The Polyphonic Spree	3:26
12.	"Walking on Thin Ice"	Jason Pierce (from Spiritualized)	5:07
13.	"Toyboat"	Anohni and Hahn Rowe	4:24
14.	"Cambridge 1969/2007"	The Flaming Lips	5:37
15.	"I'm Moving On"	The Sleepy Jackson	4:55
16.	"Witch Shocktronica Outro"	Hank Shocklee	0:30
17.	"Shiranakatta (I Didn't Know)" (first included on the 2004 Benefits Compilation "Genocide in Sudan")	Craig Armstrong	3:09

- All other tracks previously unreleased

== Charts ==
Chart (2007)	Peak position
US Billboard Top Electronic Albums	11

== Release history ==
Country	Date	Format	Label	Catalog	Ref.
Europe & United States	February 2007	CD	Astralwerks	ASW 79287	
Japan	11 April 2007	CD	Astralwerks	TOCP-70222	
