= Open Your Box (album) =

Remix album by Yoko Ono
- Released: April 24, 2007
- Genre: House
- Length: 62:45
- Label: Astralwerks

Yoko Ono chronology
Yes, I'm a Witch (2007)	Open Your Box (2007)	Don't Stop Me! EP (2009)

Singles from Open Your Box
- 1. "You're the One" Released: 2007

Professional ratings
Review scores
Source	Rating
AllMusic	3/5 stars
Pitchfork	(6.7/10)
PopMatters	4/10 stars

Open Your Box is a remix album by Yoko Ono which was released on April 24, 2007. It is a compilation of her successful series of remix singles released since 2001 with the addition of several new mixes. Collaborators include Basement Jaxx, Felix da Housecat and the Pet Shop Boys. "You're the One" was released as a single and reached No. 2 on the Billboard Hot Dance Club Play chart in the United States. Ono achieved a number one on the Hot Dance Club Play chart in August 2008 with "Give Peace a Chance".

== Track listing ==
All songs written by Yoko Ono. Tracks 1, 3, 6, 8, 9 and 11-13 are edited versions. All others are exclusive to this compilation.

No.	Title	Remix	Length
1.	"You're the One"	Bimbo Jones Main Mix	5:25
2.	"Everyman Everywoman"	Basement Jaxx Classic II Mix	4:27
3.	"Walking on Thin Ice"	Felix da Housecat's Tribute Mix	4:25
4.	"Hell in Paradise"	Peter Rauhofer Reconstruction Mix	5:55
5.	"Give Me Something"	Morel Pink Noise Vocal Mix	4:22
6.	"Walking on Thin Ice"	Pet Shop Boys Electro Mix	5:31
7.	"I Don't Know Why"	Sapphirecut Mix	4:38
8.	"Yang Yang"	Orange Factory Down & Dirty Mix	5:01
9.	"Will I"	John Creamer & Stephane K Mix	5:17
10.	"Everyman Everywoman"	Murk Space Mix	3:59
11.	"Kiss Kiss Kiss"	Superchumbo Main Mix	3:49
12.	"Open Your Box"	Orange Factory Club Mix	6:19
13.	"Walking on Thin Ice"	Danny Tenaglia Walked Across the Lake Mix	7:50
14.	"Give Peace a Chance"	DJ Dan Vocal Mix	5:47

== Singles ==
Year	Single	Chart	Peak position
2007	"You're the One"	U.S. Billboard Hot Dance Club Play	2
2008	"Give Peace a Chance"	U.S. Billboard Hot Dance Club Play	1
