= A Story =

Studio album by Yoko Ono
- Released: 1 July 1997
- Recorded: 1974
- Studios: Record Plant, New York City
- Genres: Pop; rock; experimental
- Length: 43:30
- Label: Rykodisc
- Producers: Yoko Ono, David Spinozza

Yoko Ono chronology
Rising (1996)	A Story (1997)	Blueprint for a Sunrise (2001)

Professional ratings
Review scores
Source	Rating
AllMusic	4/5 stars

A Story is the ninth studio album by Japanese musician Yoko Ono, recorded in 1974, during the "lost weekend" period in which John Lennon produced Walls and Bridges.

== Background ==
=== Original recording ===
According to the liner notes of Onobox, the songs on this album were recorded in 1974, though some songs were written earlier. In Yoko's commentary on the album, she stated that it was made when she was separated from John. Even though the album was finished, she felt the mixes "were not that great" and had always been "bothered" about this, thus the songs were remixed for the Onobox set. Once Yoko got back together with John, she felt it was not important to release the album.

The song "Will You Touch Me" was originally written in 1971 and a demo recording from that time was released in 1997 on the Rykodisc CD remaster of Fly. "Dogtown" was first written in 1972 and demo recording from the time was included on the 1997 CD remaster of Approximately Infinite Universe. The songs "It Happened", "Winter Friend" and "Yes, I'm a Witch" were all originally composed in 1973 while the remaining songs were composed in 1974.

=== Re-recorded songs ===
Several songs were re-recorded by Yoko during the early 1980s. "Hard Times Are Over" was re-recorded for Double Fantasy, released in 1980. "Dogtown", "Will You Touch Me" and "She Gets Down on Her Knees" were re-recorded for Season of Glass in 1981, while "Loneliness" and "Tomorrow May Never Come" were re-recorded for 1982's It's Alright (I See Rainbows).

Additionally, a remixed version of "It Happened" was released as the B-side to "Walking on Thin Ice" in 1981. "Yes, I'm a Witch" would become the title track to the 2007 remix album of the same name.

=== Release ===
The album remained unreleased until the 1990s, when it was issued in two versions in 1992 and 1997. The only song to receive an official release before the 1990s was "It Happened" which was released as the B-side of the Japanese single "Yume O Moto".

The 1992 box set Onobox dedicated most of its sixth and final disc to album. The first nine songs on the disc were also included on the 1997 standalone release of the album, and additionally included a couple of songs from the 1972 album Some Time in New York City, two standalone Japanese singles from 1973 and 1974, and two additional songs from the "lost weekend" period that did not appear on the later 1997 release titled "O'Oh" and "Namyohorengekyo".

A proper standalone release came in 1997 as part of Rykodisc's series of remasters on Compact disc. This release included two additional songs that did not appear on the Onobox disc, "She Gets Down on Her Knees" and "Hard Times are Over". The reissue added three bonus tracks, two home demos and a live recording from the Starpeace tour.

== Track listing ==
1. "A Story" – 2:38
2. "Loneliness" – 3:33
3. "Will You Touch Me" – 2:39
4. "Dogtown" – 3:32
5. "Tomorrow May Never Come" – 2:52
6. "Yes, I'm a Witch" – 3:11
7. "She Gets Down on Her Knees" – 4:50
8. "It Happened" – 3:52
9. "Winter Friend" – 3:17
10. "Heartburn Stew" – 2:09
11. "Hard Times Are Over" – 4:37

Bonus tracks

12. "Anatano Te" (Demo) – 3:35
13. "Extension 33" (Demo) – 1:27
14. "Now or Never" (Live) (A cappella) – 1:18

== Personnel ==
- Yoko Ono – vocals, backing vocals
- Ann E. Sutton, Erin Dickins, Gail Kantor, Louise Messina – backing vocals on "Heartburn Stew", "Hard Times are Over" and "Tomorrow May Never Come"
- Something Different – background vocals on "Tomorrow May Never Come"
- David Spinozza, Hugh McCracken – guitar
- Gordon Edwards – bass guitar
- Kenneth Ascher – keyboards
- Leon Pendarvis – keyboards on "She Gets Down on Her Knees"
- Arthur Jenkins Jr. – percussion
- Michael Brecker – tenor saxophone
- Alan Rubin, Randy Brecker – trumpet
- Lew Delgatto – baritone saxophone, bass clarinet
- George Young – flute, clarinet
- Rick Marotta – drums

Technical

- Produced by Yoko Ono and David Spinozza
- Recorded at Record Plant, N.Y., 1974
- Ed Sprigg, Jack Douglas – recording engineers
- Ed Sprigg, Roy Cicala – mix engineers
- Kevin Herron – assistant engineer

"Anatano Te" & "Extension 33" (Rykodisc CD Bonus Demo Tracks)

- Yoko Ono – vocal and piano
- Recorded on cassette, Dakota Period

"Now or Never" (Rykodisc CD Bonus Live Track)

- Yoko Ono – vocal
- Recorded live in Budapest, 1986

== Production ==
- David Spinozza, Rob Stevens, Yoko Ono – producers
- Ed Sprigg, Jack Douglas – recording
- George Marino, Rob Stevens – remastering
- Kevin Herron – engineer
- Ed Sprigg, Roy Cicala – mixing
- Black + Copper, Cindy Nelson – design [CD Package]
- Karla Merrifield – illustration [Hand Tinting]

== Release history ==
Country	Date	Format	Label	Catalog	Ref.
United States	1 July 1997	CD	Rykodisc	RCD 10420	
United Kingdom	18 August 1997	CD	Rykodisc	RCD 10420	
Japan	27 August 1997	CD	Rykodisc	VACK-5376	
