= Anika (album) =

Studio album by Anika
- Released: 25 October 2010
- Recorded: 2010
- Genre: Dub; electronic; avant-garde; post-punk
- Length: 36:09
- Label: Invada Records; Stones Throw
- Producer: Geoff Barrow; Beak

Singles from Anika
- 1. "Yang Yang" Released: 13 September 2010; 2. "No One's There" Released: 4 July 2011

Anika is the debut studio album by British/German recording artist Anika. It was released on 25 October 2010 by Invada Records in Europe and on 15 November 2010, by Stones Throw Records in the United States. The three members of the band Beak (Geoff Barrow, Billy Fuller and Matt Williams) produced the album.

== Background ==
Before she began her singing career, Anika was a political journalist who spent her time between Berlin and Bristol, England. She met producer Geoff Barrow (of Portishead), who was looking for a female vocalist to work with his band Beak. Anika joined the band in the studio and recorded nine songs in 12 days with no overdubs.

== Critical reception ==
Professional ratings
Aggregate scores
| Source | Rating |
|---|---|
| Metacritic | (65/100) |
Review scores
| Source | Rating |
| AllMusic | 4/5 stars |
| Drowned in Sound | favourable |
| Dusted | (critical) |
| MusicOMH | 3.5/5 stars |
| The New York Times | favourable |
| Pitchfork | (6.5/10) |
| Under the Radar | 3/10 stars |

The album received generally favorable reviews. It earned a collective score of 65 out of 100 from Metacritic. Heather Phares from AllMusic stated, "Though the album is mostly covers, Anika imprints her identity on every track. [...] Anika is a bold, often fearless debut, and even if it’s occasionally an acquired taste, it doesn’t hedge its bets." David Edwards, writing for Drowned in Sound, described the album as an "unhinged record that isn’t easy to look squarely in the eye. But the reward is in the depth and sheer bewilderment of every single creak, croak and crackle." Ben Hogwood of musicOMH commented, "Anika, then, has made an intriguing record, but not one that should be listened to by nervy people in isolation. Full of lyrical and musical contradictions, [...], it isn't exactly rabble rousing - but has a strange allure nonetheless."

== Singles ==
"Yang Yang" was released as the album's lead single commercially worldwide on 13 September 2010, through digital distribution.

"No One's There" was released as the second single from the album on 4 July 2011. The music video for "No One's There" was directed by John Minton, who had also directed the music video for "Yang Yang." In the music video, Anika sings in a Warholian Plastic Inevitable setting intercut with shots of Bristol and Stokes Croft council estates and other gritty, empty street scenes. Ken Taylor from XLR8R praised the single for combining "Delta 5-meets-Nico-style vocals and rude-boy dub rhythms for something that's as joyously energizing as it is nostalgic."

== Promotion ==
To promote Anika, Anika toured as part of the Portishead-curated festival "All Tomorrow's Parties" from 30 September to 2 October 2011, with fellow Stones Throw label-mate Peanut Butter Wolf.

Anika sung "I Go to Sleep" live and premiered her filmed performance for PopMatters on 27 January 2011.

== Track listing ==
| No. | Title | Writer(s) | Length |
|---|---|---|---|
| 1. | "Terry" | Lynn Ripley | 5:08 |
| 2. | "Yang Yang" | Yoko Ono | 2:55 |
| 3. | "End of the World" | Arthur Kent, Sylvia Dee | 2:59 |
| 4. | "Masters of War" | Bob Dylan | 7:33 |
| 5. | "Officer Officer" | Anika, Beak> | 3:40 |
| 6. | "Sadness Hides the Sun" | Eric Woolfson | 3:43 |
| 7. | "No One's There" | Anika, Beak> | 3:48 |
| 8. | "I Go to Sleep" | Ray Davies | 3:22 |
| 9. | "Masters of War (Dub)" | Dylan | 3:26 |

== Personnel ==
Credits for Anika adapted from AllMusic.

- Anika – composer, vocals
- Geoff Barrow – producer
- Shawn Joseph – mastering
- Stuart Matthews – engineer
- Clare May – cover photo
- Johnny O-Carroll – artwork
- Ratman – remixing
- Mig Schillace – artwork
