= Michael Hannah, The Lost Years =

- Cover featuring a photograph from the period of the album's recording.

Compilation album by Twinkle
- Released: 2003
- Recorded: 1973
- Genre: British pop music
- Language: English
- Label: Acrobat
- Producer: Mike d'Abo

Michael Hannah, The Lost Years is a 2003 pop album by English singer-songwriter Twinkle (Lynn Ripley).

The album is a compilation of songs originally produced in 1974, many of them inspired by and about model Michael Hannah, Ripley's former partner. Despite being completed in 1974 the recordings remained unreleased following the death of Hannah in the Turkish Airlines Flight 981 crash that same year. The master tapes were later presumed lost but were recovered and finally released in 2003.

== Production ==
In 1973 Ripley was encouraged by model Michael Hannah (her one time partner) to continue making music in spite of recent setbacks after her initial hit songs in the late 1960s. Despite Ripley marrying their mutual friend and fellow model Graham Rogers in 1972 Hannah continued to have a strong impact on her and her songwriting. Work on a debut album for Ripley began at Instant Records with producer Mike d'Abo. d'Abo had earlier helmed production of her 1969 single "Micky" and its B-side "Darby and Joan", as well as the song "Soldier", all of whom were inspired by Hannah. During recording he was killed aboard the Turkish Airlines Flight 981 accident in Paris. In the aftermath Ripley continued working on the album. Newly written songs, many of them with lyrics based on Hannah's life and the two's turbulent relationship were added, including the title track "Michael Hannah", but most of the material was never published. Only the promotional single "Days"/"Caroline" ended up being released by Bradley's Records. The master tapes for the album (intended to be an LP record originally titled simply Michael Hannah in tribute) were believed lost by the people involved following the project being cancelled. The tapes were found again in 2003 and the album was finally released by Acrobat as a CD. The published album includes "Soldier" as the ending track.

== Track listing ==
All tracks are written by Twinkle.

No.	Title	Length
1.	"Michael Hannah"	02:41
2.	"Bowden House"	05:08
3.	"I Am A Woman"	03:53
4.	"Joanna"	03:02
5.	"Ladyfriend"	06:10
6.	"Days"	03:36
7.	"Caroline"	03:38
8.	"Jane"	03:29
9.	"Zefferelli"	04:37
10.	"Soldier"	03:08

== Reception ==
The album received a positive review from Uncut. Caroline Boucher of The Observer gave the album a favorable review, stating that while the lyrics are "sometimes simplistic" it "nevertheless has its place as a stepping stone in the English order of things". Joe Marchese of The Second Disc found the album to be "a fine entry in singer-songwriter mode". East Anglian Daily Times called it "imperfect" but "moving, sometimes wonderfully so". Ian Canty of Louder Than War expressed that album would be eye-opening listening for anyone who was only familiar with Ripley's big hit "Terry". Canty noted what he felt was lyrical maturity compared to her earlier work. He also expressed shock that the album was not put out when it was completed.

== See also ==
- Category:Debut albums
