= My Man (Yoko Ono song) =

Single by Yoko Ono

from the album It's Alright (I See Rainbows)
- B-side: "Let the Tears Dry"
- Released: 1 November 1982 (US); 26 November 1982 (UK)
- Recorded: 1982
- Genre: Rock; new wave; dance; calypso
- Length: 3:58
- Label: Polydor
- Songwriter: Yoko Ono
- Producer: Yoko Ono

Yoko Ono singles chronology
"Goodbye Sadness" (1981)	"My Man" (1982)	"Never Say Goodbye" (1983)

"My Man" is a 1982 single by Yoko Ono from the album It's Alright (I See Rainbows) in a new wave/calypso style. "Let the Tears Dry" appeared on the B-side.

== Background ==
The song was originally written in 1980.

Yoko wrote about the song when it was included on her 1992 boxset Onobox:

MY MAN was originally called MY PAPA because I referred to John as “Papa” when I spoke about him to my Japanese speaking friends, just as John started to sometimes call me “Mother” after Sean was born. John thought I should not call the song MY PAPA because there was already a song called that. “What about MY OLD MAN? ” he said. That didn’t seem quite right. We laughed. I had kept the song on the backburner and changed it to MY MAN at the time of the recording.

— Yoko Ono, "ONOBOX by Yoko Ono".

== Reception ==
Cash Box said that it is one of Ono's catchiest pop songs. Billboard recommended it.

Ultimate Classic Rock critic Michael Gallucci rated it as Ono's 8th best song.

Record Business described "My Man" as "an accessible piece of music employing up-to-date synth techniques with suitably sparse accompaniment" but felt that its chances of chart success were "severely limited by Yoko's own restrictions as a vocalist".

In 1993, the music video was featured on the episode of Beavis and Butt-Head.

== Charts ==
Chart (1982)	Peak position
UK Bubbling Under Singles (Record Business)	129
UK Airplay (Record Business)	76

== Release history ==
Country	Date	Format	Label	Cat. No.	Ref.
United Kingdom	26 November 1982	7-inch	Polydor	POSP 541	
