= Move on Fast =

1972 single by Yoko Ono

Single by Yoko Ono

from the album Approximately Infinite Universe
- A-side: "Now or Never"
- Released: 13 November 1972
- Genre: Rock
- Length: 3:40
- Label: Apple
- Songwriter: Yoko Ono
- Producers: John Lennon, Yoko Ono

Yoko Ono singles chronology
"Mind Train" (1972)	"Move on Fast" (1972)	"Death of Samantha" (1973)

"Move on Fast"

Single by Yoko Ono
- Released: 2011
- Genre: Rock, Dance
- Label: TWISTED Records
- Songwriter: Yoko Ono
- Producer: Yoko Ono

Yoko Ono singles chronology
"Wouldnit (I'm a Star)" (2010)	"Move on Fast" (2011)	"Talking to the Universe" (2011)

"Move on Fast" is a song by Yoko Ono, originally released in 1972 on the album Approximately Infinite Universe, and on the B-side to the single "Now or Never". The song was later included on Ono's compilation album Onobox. The song was part of the set for John Lennon's and Ono's One on One concerts on 30 August 1972 at Madison Square Garden, and was included on the 2025 Power to the People: Live at the One to One Concert albums.

== Composition ==
In contrast to the folksy Dylan-esque single "Now or Never" song that the song was originally released as a B-side to, "Move on Fast" is described by Yoko Ono as an "offbeat pop/rock sound", which also draws from bop, big band swing, and "razor-sharp feminist rock." Ben Urish and Ken Bielen described the song as "a straight-ahead rocker that hits the ground running and never lets up." They also praise John Lennon's guitar playing. John Lennon biographer Jon Wiener claimed that the song has a "furious rock beat." He described Ono's vocal as employing "a nervous, blank voice that qualifies as proto-New Wave."

== Chart performance ==
The song became Yoko Ono's sixth consecutive number-one hit on the Billboard Hot Dance Club Songs chart and her eighth number-one hit overall.

== Track listing ==
- Digital download (Disc one)
1. "Move on Fast" (Richard Morel Radio Edit) – 4:25
2. "Move on Fast" (Richard Morel Vocal) – 7:54
3. "Move on Fast" (Timmy Loop Bluelight Club) – 7:14
4. "Move on Fast" (Nacho Chapado & Ivan Gomez Vocal) – 8:59
5. "Move on Fast" (Twisted Sound+Vision Club) – 7:18
6. "Move on Fast" (Ralphi Rosario Dub) – 8:15
7. "Move on Fast" (Richard Morel Dub) – 7:17
8. "Move on Fast" (Timmy Loop Infinity Dub) – 6:27
9. "Move on Fast" (Nacho Chapado & Ivan Gomez Dub) – 6:59
10. "Move on Fast" (Twisted Sound+Vision Dub) – 4:43
- Digital download (Disc two)
1. "Move on Fast" (Emjae Club) – 6:40
2. "Move on Fast" (Chris the Greek Club) – 8:02
3. "Move on Fast" (Digital Dog Club) – 6:10
4. "Move on Fast" (Yiannis Acceleration Club) – 7:43
5. "Move on Fast" (Emjae Dubstramental) – 6:40
6. "Move on Fast" (Emjae Underwater Dub) – 4:53
7. "Move on Fast" (Chris the Greek Dub) – 5:56
8. "Move on Fast" (Digital Dog Dub) – 6:25
9. "Move on Fast" (Yiannis Acceleration Dub) – 7:44
10. "Move on Fast" (Digital Dog Radio Edit) – 3:41
11. "Move on Fast" (Yiannis Acceleration Radio Edit) – 3:40
- Digital download (Disc three)
1. "Move on Fast" (Dave Audé Club Mix) – 7:55
2. "Move on Fast" (Dave Audé Club Dub) – 7:24
3. "Move on Fast" (Dave Audé Dub Dub) – 7:24
4. "Move on Fast" (Dave Audé Mixshow) – 6:25
5. "Move on Fast" (Dave Audé Radio Mix) – 4:26
6. "Move on Fast" (Wawa Club Mix) – 7:11
7. "Move on Fast" (Wawa Dub) – 5:56
8. "Move on Fast" (Wawa Club Instrumental) – 7:11
9. "Move on Fast" (Wawa Radio Mix) – 3:56

== Charts ==
=== Weekly charts ===
Chart (2011)	Peak position
US Dance Club Songs (Billboard)	1
Global Dance Tracks (Billboard)	33

=== Year-end charts ===
Chart (2011)	Position
US Hot Dance Club Songs (Billboard)	21

== See also ==
- List of number-one dance singles of 2011 (U.S.)
