= Starpeace =

Studio album by Yoko Ono
- Released: 18 November 1985
- Studios: Right Track, New York City
- Genres: Rock; new wave
- Length: 40:21
- Label: PolyGram
- Producers: Bill Laswell, Yoko Ono

Yoko Ono chronology
Milk and Honey (1984)	Starpeace (1985)	Onobox (1992)

Singles from Starpeace
- 1. "Hell in Paradise" Released: 13 October 1985; 2. "Cape Clear" Released: December 1985

Starpeace is the seventh studio album by Japanese musician Yoko Ono. It was a concept album designed to spread a message of peace around the world as an opposition to Ronald Reagan's "Star Wars" missile defense system. The album was subtitled An Earth Play for Sun and Air in the booklet and on the disc.

== Background ==
In 1986, Ono set out on a world tour to accompany the album's message. The CD reissue by Rykodisc in 1997, includes a live recording of "Imagine" from the sellout Budapest show of the tour. An a cappella version of "Now or Never" from the same show was also a bonus track on A Story. Like with the Rykodisc reissue of It's Alright, the 1997 release of Starpeace used newly remixed versions of all songs. The original mixes only received a CD release in Japan in 1985.

The 1984 video documentary release Yoko Ono: Now & Then includes footage of the recording sessions for Starpeace. Over the end credits, Ono performs an unreleased song apparently entitled "Rainbow Time".

As with most Ono albums, it did not chart extensively but the single release of "Hell in Paradise" reached #16 on the US dance charts.

"Cape Clear" was released as the album's second single, available on the 12" format. The single features a Vocal Remix and Instrumental Mix of "Cape Clear" along with a re-edit of "Walking on Thin Ice" on the flipside.

== Reception ==
Professional ratings
Review scores
Source	Rating
AllMusic	2/5 stars
Robert Christgau	B−
Music Week	3/5 stars
Sounds	1/5 stars

The album received mixed reviews. Sounds gave it a one star (out of five) review, calling it "a slab of pretentious AOR offal". Spin writer Armond White called it "a Sesame Street album for children who think My Weekly Reader has been withholding the truth", and said that "the album's placidity and earnestness make embarrassing claims on our emotions". AllMusic writer Richie Unterberger retrospectively gave it two stars out of five, praising the backing musicians but also stating the tracks were "often imbued with a kind of sappy utopianism". Peter Buckley, in The Rough Guide to Rock, has described the album as "a rather bombastic error of judgement, laden down by pseudo-cosmic philosophizing". Rick Shefchik, in the Charlotte Observer called it "the same old '60s hippie drivel".

On the other hand, Robert Palmer of The New York Times gave the album a positive review, calling it "splended" [sic], viewing it as "the most balanced album Miss Ono has made", and describing it as "state-of-the-art pop music for 1985". Rolling Stone also reviewed the album positively, with Anthony Decurtis writing that "Starpeace seamlessly fuses artistic daring and accessibility... there can be no denying that this fifty-two-year-old pop star now fully deserves to be reckoned with on her own demanding terms". Music Week gave the album three starts, describing it as "rather more tuneful" than previous albums by Yoko and that it could "attract more general sales" outside of her cult following.

According to Music Week the album sold "no more than 4,000 copies across Europe" and Polydor chose not to renew Yoko's contract as a result. The poor response to the album and low ticket sales on the world tour led to Ono withdrawing from making music for several years, later saying "After Starpeace I was totally discouraged...by the fact that there was no kind of demand for what I was doing, to put it mildly!". She returned to music with the critically acclaimed Rising in 1996.

== Track listing ==
All songs written by Yoko Ono, except where noted.

Air Side
No.	Title	Length
1.	"Hell in Paradise"	3:27
2.	"I Love All of Me"	3:53
3.	"Children Power"	2:26
4.	"Rainbow Revelation"	3:17
5.	"The King of the Zoo"	3:10
6.	"Remember Raven"	2:12

Be Side
No.	Title	Length
7.	"Cape Clear"	4:52
8.	"Sky People"	3:46
9.	"You and I"	3:01
10.	"It's Gonna Rain (Living on Tiptoe)"	3:42
11.	"Starpeace"	3:17
12.	"I Love You, Earth"	2:40

Reissue bonus track
No.	Title	Writer(s)	Length
13.	"Imagine" (Live)	John Lennon	4:44

== Singles ==
=== Hell in Paradise ===
- GER 7" single, 883 455-7 (Worldwide 7" Track List)
1. "Hell in Paradise" (single version) – 3:34
2. "Hell in Paradise" (instrumental) – 3:34
- US 12" single, 883 455-1 (Worldwide 12" Track List)
1. "Hell in Paradise" (club version) – 6:52
2. "Hell in Paradise" (dub version) – 8:25
3. "Hell in Paradise" (instrumental) – 3:34
- US 7" promo, 883 455-7
1. "Hell in Paradise" (single version) – 3:34
2. "Hell in Paradise" (single version) – 3:34

=== Cape Clear ===
- US 12" promo, 883 872-1
1. "Cape Clear" (vocal remix) – 6:32
2. "Cape Clear" (instrumental remix) – 5:02
3. "Walking on Thin Ice" (re-edit) – 7:17

== Personnel ==
- Yoko Ono – vocals, cover concept
- Bernie Worrell, Jeff Bova – keyboards
- Eddie Martinez – guitar, guitar synthesizer, electric sitar
- L. Shankar – violin
- Robbie Shakespeare – bass guitar
- Sly Dunbar – drums, electronic drums, percussion
- Tony Williams – drums
- Aïyb Dieng, Daniel Ponce, Anton Fier – percussion
- Tony Levin – whistle
- Bernard Fowler, Yolanda Lee Lewis – backing vocals
- Nona Hendryx – backing vocals on "Hell in Paradise" and "Starpeace"
- Sean Lennon – vocals on "Starpeace"

Technical

- Produced by Bill Laswell and Yoko Ono
- Recorded and mixed by Rob Stevens
- Francesco Scavullo – cover photography

"Imagine" (Rykodisc CD Reissue Bonus Track)

Recorded live during the Starpeace tour in Budapest, Hungary on March 14, 1986.

- Yoko Ono – vocal
- Jimmy Rip – guitar
- Leigh Foxx – bass guitar
- Mark Rivera, Phil Ashley – keyboards
- Benny Gramm – drums
- Steve Scales – percussion

== Tour ==
In 1986 Yoko set out on a goodwill world tour for Starpeace, mostly visiting Eastern European countries that she felt were in need of her message of peace. Ono refused to tour with a corporate sponsor and personally financed the endeavour herself.

Planned US tour dates were postponed and eventually cancelled due to disappointing ticket sales.

The Starpeace setlist usually consisted of:

- "Midsummer New York"
- "Give Me Something"
- "Kiss Kiss Kiss"
- "It Happened"
- "Walking on Thin Ice"
- "Death of Samantha"
- "Goodbye Sadness"
- "Never Say Goodbye"
- "Hell in Paradise"
- "Sky People"
- "Starpeace"
- "I Love All of Me"
- "I See Rainbows"
- "Dream Love"
- "Now or Never"
- "Imagine" (encore)
- "Give Peace a Chance" (encore)

=== Tour dates ===
Planned tour dates were as follows:

- March 1 – The Hague
- March 2 – West Berlin
- March 4 – Warsaw
- March 6 – Munich
- March 7 – Frankfurt
- March 8 – Manheim
- March 10 – Stockholm
- March 11 – Copenhagen
- March 12 – Hamburg
- March 14 – Budapest
- March 16 – Vienna
- March 18 – Ljubljana
- March 21 – London
- March 24 – Dublin
- April 1 – Toronto
- April 2 – Montreal
- April 4 – Boston
- April 6 – Philadelphia
- April 7 – Washington
- April 8 – Providence
- April 10 – New York
- April 13 – Chicago
- April 17 – Los Angeles
- April 18 – San Francisco
- April 20 – Seattle

=== Commercial releases ===
Selected live performances from the tour have been released on compact disc. Rykodisc's 1997 CD reissues of A Story and Starpeace included live performances of "Now or Never" and "Imagine", both recorded at Budapest on March 14, 1986. A live performance of "Dream Love" from the same show was released on the 2026 CD and digital reissue of It's Alright (I See Rainbows) by Chimera Music/Secretly Canadian.

== Release history ==
Country	Date	Format	Label	Catalog	Ref.
United States	19 November 1985	LP	Polydor	827 5301 Y1	
United Kingdom	2 December 1985	LP; Cassette	Polydor	827 530-1; 827 530-4	
Japan	1985	LP; CD	Polydor	28MM 0472; P33P 20034	
Germany	1985	LP	Polydor	827 530-1	
United States	1 July 1997	CD	Rykodisc	RCD 10423	
Japan	27 August 1997	CD	Rykodisc	VACK-5379	
United Kingdom	8 September 1997	CD	Rykodisc	RCD 10423	
