= Onobox =

Box set by Yoko Ono
- Released: March 1992
- Recorded: 1968–1992
- Genres: Rock; experimental; pop; new wave
- Length: 388:18
- Label: Rykodisc
- Producer: Yoko Ono

Yoko Ono chronology
| Starpeace (1985) | Onobox (1992) | Walking on Thin Ice (1992) |

Professional ratings
Review scores
| Source | Rating |
|---|---|
| AllMusic | 4.5/5 stars |
| Entertainment Weekly | A− |

Onobox is a 1992 comprehensive 6-disc collection of Yoko Ono's work from 1968 to 1985. The discs are grouped by era and theme.

Onobox was complemented by an accompanying one-disc "greatest hits" release, entitled Walking on Thin Ice. While the Rykodisc press release for Onobox declared the collection "not as bad as you might think", it also urged the public to "smash your preconceptions". Which, for the most part, they did, finding the box gave "Yoko Ono the avant- garde heroine her due".

== Background ==
Disc one centers around the albums Yoko Ono/Plastic Ono Band (1970) and Fly (1971), while Disc two features nearly the entirety of Approximately Infinite Universe (1973) in a different running order and most of the tracks remixed exclusively for this boxed set. Disc three features the entire Feeling the Space (1974) project, which was originally conceived and recorded as a double album before being edited down, while disc six is the previously unreleased 1974 album A Story, which was later reissued separately with an expanded track listing, along with the rest of Ono's back catalogue.

Discs four and five center on her relationship with her late husband and musician John Lennon, with "Kiss, Kiss, Kiss" highlighting songs from their duet albums Double Fantasy (1980) and Milk and Honey (1982), while "No, No, No" focuses on the albums Yoko released in the aftermath of the murder of John Lennon; Season of Glass (1981), It's Alright (I See Rainbows) (1982) and Starpeace (1985).

== Track listing ==
All songs written by Yoko Ono except "No Bed for Beatle John" co-written by John Lennon.

Many songs were edited or remixed for this compilation. These mixes and edits have not been officially released elsewhere.

=== Disc one ===
London Jam
| No. | Title | Album | Length |
|---|---|---|---|
| 1. | "No Bed for Beatle John" (Excerpt) | Unfinished Music No.2: Life with the Lions | 2:00 |
| 2. | "Mind Holes" | Fly | 2:45 |
| 3. | "O'Wind (Body is the Scar of Your Mind)" | Fly | 5:24 |
| 4. | "Why" | Yoko Ono/Plastic Ono Band | 5:30 |
| 5. | "Why Not" | Yoko Ono/Plastic Ono Band | 9:55 |
| 6. | "Greenfield Morning I Pushed an Empty Baby Carriage All Over the City" | Yoko Ono/Plastic Ono Band | 5:36 |
| 7. | "Touch Me" (Edit) | Yoko Ono/Plastic Ono Band | 4:23 |
| 8. | "Paper Shoes" (Edit) | Yoko Ono/Plastic Ono Band | 3:45 |
| 9. | "Mind Train" (Edit) | Fly | 3:56 |
| 10. | "Open Your Box" (Uncensored Version - also known as "Hirake") | Fly | 3:32 |
| 11. | "Toilet Piece / Unknown" | Fly | 0:31 |
| 12. | "Don't Worry Kyoko (Mummy's Only Looking for Her Hand in the Snow)" | Fly | 4:53 |
| 13. | "Telephone Piece" (US Version) | Fly | 0:30 |
| 14. | "Midsummer New York" (Edit) | Fly | 2:16 |
| 15. | "The Path" | Previously unreleased | 5:43 |
| 16. | "Don't Count the Waves" (Edit) | Fly | 3:54 |
| 17. | "Head Play" (Medley: You/Airmale/Fly) | Previously unreleased | 2:33 |
| 18. | "Is Winter Here to Stay?" | Approximately Infinite Universe | 4:20 |

=== Disc two ===
New York Rock
| No. | Title | Album | Length |
|---|---|---|---|
| 1. | "Yang Yang" (Remix) | Approximately Infinite Universe | 3:48 |
| 2. | "Death of Samantha" (Remix) | Approximately Infinite Universe | 5:05 |
| 3. | "What Did I Do!" (Remix) | Approximately Infinite Universe | 3:50 |
| 4. | "Approximately Infinite Universe" (Remix) | Approximately Infinite Universe | 3:19 |
| 5. | "What a Bastard the World is" (Remix) | Approximately Infinite Universe | 4:36 |
| 6. | "Catman (The Rosies are Coming)" (Remix) | Approximately Infinite Universe | 5:44 |
| 7. | "I Want My Love to Rest Tonight" | Approximately Infinite Universe | 5:09 |
| 8. | "Shiranakatta (I Didn't Know)" | Approximately Infinite Universe | 3:09 |
| 9. | "Peter the Dealer" (Remix) | Approximately Infinite Universe | 4:58 |
| 10. | "I Felt Like Smashing My Face in a Clear Glass Window" | Approximately Infinite Universe | 4:08 |
| 11. | "Winter Song" (Remix) | Approximately Infinite Universe | 3:38 |
| 12. | "Kite Song" (Remix) | Approximately Infinite Universe | 3:09 |
| 13. | "Now or Never" (Edit) | Approximately Infinite Universe | 3:45 |
| 14. | "What a Mess" (Remix) | Approximately Infinite Universe | 2:42 |
| 15. | "I Have a Woman Inside My Soul" (Remix) | Approximately Infinite Universe | 5:05 |
| 16. | "Move on Fast" (Remix) | Approximately Infinite Universe | 3:42 |
| 17. | "Looking Over from My Hotel Window" | Approximately Infinite Universe | 3:29 |
| 18. | "Waiting for the Sunrise" | Approximately Infinite Universe | 2:33 |

=== Disc three ===
Run, Run, Run
| No. | Title | Album | Length |
|---|---|---|---|
| 1. | "Growing Pain" | Feeling the Space | 3:51 |
| 2. | "Yellow Girl (Stand by for Life)" | Feeling the Space | 3:16 |
| 3. | "Coffin Car" | Feeling the Space | 3:32 |
| 4. | "Warrior Woman" | Previously unreleased | 5:01 |
| 5. | "Woman of Salem" (Remix) | Feeling the Space | 3:31 |
| 6. | "Run, Run, Run" | Feeling the Space | 5:09 |
| 7. | "If Only" (Remix) | Feeling the Space | 3:26 |
| 8. | "A Thousand Times Yes" (Remix) | Feeling the Space | 3:02 |
| 9. | "Straight Talk" (Remix) | Feeling the Space | 2:59 |
| 10. | "Angry Young Woman" | Feeling the Space | 3:53 |
| 11. | "Potbelly Rocker" | Previously unreleased | 2:43 |
| 12. | "She Hits Back" (Remix) | Feeling the Space | 4:04 |
| 13. | "Men, Men, Men" | Feeling the Space | 4:02 |
| 14. | "Woman Power" (Remix) | Feeling the Space | 5:37 |
| 15. | "It's Been Very Hard" | Previously unreleased | 5:57 |
| 16. | "Mildred, Mildred" | Previously unreleased | 2:57 |
| 17. | "Left Turn's the Right Turn" | Previously unreleased | 2:10 |

=== Disc four ===
Kiss, Kiss, Kiss
| No. | Title | Album | Length |
|---|---|---|---|
| 1. | "Walking on Thin Ice" | Non-Album Single | 6:01 |
| 2. | "Kiss Kiss Kiss" | Double Fantasy | 2:40 |
| 3. | "Give Me Something" | Double Fantasy | 1:34 |
| 4. | "I'm Moving On" | Double Fantasy | 5:30 |
| 5. | "Yes, I'm Your Angel" (Extended Intro) | Double Fantasy | 3:35 |
| 6. | "Beautiful Boys" | Double Fantasy | 2:53 |
| 7. | "Open Your Soul to Me" | Previously unreleased | 3:45 |
| 8. | "Every Man Has a Woman Who Loves Him" | Double Fantasy | 4:03 |
| 9. | "Hard Times are Over" | Double Fantasy | 3:20 |
| 10. | "Don't Be Scared" (Extended Version) | Milk and Honey | 4:35 |
| 11. | "Sleepless Night" (Extended Version) | Milk and Honey | 3:53 |
| 12. | "O'Sanity" | Milk and Honey | 1:05 |
| 13. | "Your Hands" | Milk and Honey | 3:13 |
| 14. | "Let Me Count the Ways" (Extended Version) | Milk and Honey | 3:03 |
| 15. | "Forgive Me, My Love" | Previously unreleased | 3:11 |
| 16. | "You're the One" (Extended Version) | Milk and Honey | 4:34 |
| 17. | "There's No Goodbye" (Demo) | Previously unreleased | 1:57 |
| 18. | "Have You Seen a Horizon Lately" | Approximately Infinite Universe | 2:02 |

=== Disc five ===
No, No, No
| No. | Title | Album | Length |
|---|---|---|---|
| 1. | "I Don't Know Why" | Season of Glass | 4:20 |
| 2. | "Mindweaver" | Season of Glass | 4:22 |
| 3. | "Even When You're Far Away" | Season of Glass | 5:21 |
| 4. | "Nobody Sees Me Like You Do" | Season of Glass | 3:33 |
| 5. | "Silver Horse" | Season of Glass | 3:03 |
| 6. | "No, No, No" | Season of Glass | 2:46 |
| 7. | "Toyboat" | Season of Glass | 3:31 |
| 8. | "She Gets Down on Her Knees" | Season of Glass | 4:10 |
| 9. | "Extension 33" | Season of Glass | 2:44 |
| 10. | "Never Say Goodbye" (Edit) | It's Alright (I See Rainbows) | 4:01 |
| 11. | "Spec of Dust" | It's Alright (I See Rainbows) | 3:31 |
| 12. | "My Man" | It's Alright (I See Rainbows) | 3:59 |
| 13. | "It's Alright" | It's Alright (I See Rainbows) | 4:20 |
| 14. | "Let the Tears Dry" | It's Alright (I See Rainbows) | 3:29 |
| 15. | "Dream Love" | It's Alright (I See Rainbows) | 4:47 |
| 16. | "Hell in Paradise" (Remix) | Starpeace | 3:39 |
| 17. | "I Love You, Earth" | Starpeace | 2:41 |
| 18. | "In Cape Clear" | Starpeace | 4:54 |
| 19. | "Goodbye Sadness" | Season of Glass | 3:50 |

=== Disc six ===
A Story
| No. | Title | Album | Length |
|---|---|---|---|
| 1. | "A Story" | Previously unreleased | 2:38 |
| 2. | "Loneliness" | Previously unreleased version | 3:33 |
| 3. | "Will You Touch Me" | Previously unreleased version | 2:39 |
| 4. | "Dogtown" | Previously unreleased version | 3:32 |
| 5. | "It Happened" | B-side of "Yume O Moto" and "Walking on Thin Ice" | 3:52 |
| 6. | "Tomorrow May Never Come" | Previously unreleased version | 2:52 |
| 7. | "Winter Friend" | Previously unreleased | 3:17 |
| 8. | "Heartburn Stew" | Previously unreleased | 2:09 |
| 9. | "Yes, I'm a Witch" | Previously unreleased | 3:11 |
| 10. | "Yume O Moto" (Remix) | Non-Album Single | 3:45 |
| 11. | "O'Oh" | Previously unreleased | 4:00 |
| 12. | "Namyohorengekyo" | Previously unreleased | 2:42 |
| 13. | "We're All Water" (Edit) | Some Time in New York City | 3:41 |
| 14. | "Joseijoi Banzai Part 1" (Remix) | Non-Album Single | 3:33 |
| 15. | "Sisters O Sisters" | Some Time in New York City | 3:46 |

== Previously unreleased material ==
Onobox includes 20 previously unreleased songs. Some of these songs have appeared on other Ono releases.

- The first 9 tracks from Disc 6 were all included on the A Story album when it was released in 1997.
- "The Path" was included on the 2017 Reissue of Fly.
- "Warrior Woman", "Potbelly Rocker", "It's Been Very Hard", "Mildred, Mildred" and "Left Turn's the Right Turn" were all included on the 2017 Reissue of Feeling the Space.
- "Forgive Me, My Love" was included on the 2026 reissue of It's Alright (I See Rainbows).
- "There's No Goodbye" was re-recorded for the album Take Me to the Land of Hell.

In addition to this, "Head Play" (a medley of the songs "You", "Airmale" and "Fly" specially made for this boxset) was included on the 2017 reissue of Fly.

Ono explains on the last page of the box set's book that "O'Oh," "Potbelly Rocker", and "Left Turn's the Right Turn" were all unfinished, so "O'Oh" has a new lead vocal and chorus, while "Potbelly Rocker" and "Left Turn's the Right Turn" have new lead guitar by Sean Ono Lennon, credited to "Ben O'cean."

== Ultracase edition ==
A limited-edition version of Onobox was released called the "Ultracase" Edition. This version included the entire 6-disc box set along with the accompanying 1-disc Walking on Thin Ice compilation and a sculpture by Yoko called A Key to Open the Universe with a signature by Ono, all packaged in a protective carrying case. This edition was released limited to 350 copies, and a small number of boxes without Onobox but all other items were also made for those who already owned the Onobox set.

== Release history ==
| Country | Date | Format | Label | Catalog | Ref. |
|---|---|---|---|---|---|
| United States | 28 January 1992 | 6xCD | Rykodisc | RCD 10224/29 | |
| United States | 28 January 1992 | 7xCD (Ultracase Edition) | Rykodisc | RCD 10224/29 | |
| Japan | 24 June 1992 | 6xCD | Rykodisc | TOCP-7191-96 | |
