= Father Mother Sister Brother (soundtrack) =

Father Mother Sister Brother (Original Music from the Film)

Film score by Jim Jarmusch and Anika
- Released: December 24, 2025
- Recorded: 2025
- Genre: Film score
- Length: 31:24
- Label: Sacred Bones
- Producer: Jim Jarmusch; Anika

Father Mother Sister Brother (Original Music from the Film) is the film score to the 2025 film Father Mother Sister Brother written and directed by Jim Jarmusch who also co-composed the score with singer-songwriter Anika. The 16-track album was released through Sacred Bones Records on December 24, 2025.

== Development ==
The film score is jointly written and composed by Jarmusch and Anika, who previously collaborated on the 15th anniversary show of Sacred Bones Records during late-2002. The film is also Jarmusch's maiden scoring assignment after leading the SQÜRL band which had composed music for Only Lovers Left Alive (2013) and The Dead Don't Die (2019). Jarmusch contacted Anika during late-2024, when she was working on her studio albums, and asked her to compose few songs.

When Jarmusch was filming in Paris, Anika met him and provided a few arrangements of classical ensemble and string ensembles she worked in Berlin. Together they worked on the arrangements of a few tracks during the brief interval, where she would work on her solo projects and returned in a few weeks, to continue on arranging the score, as well as playing guitars and synthesizers. Anika said that she worked on a "load more stuff" and ended up playing synthesizers and guitar with Jarmusch providing feedback. Anika also used the Wurlitzer electronic musical equipment for working on the score.

Since Anika had not scored a film before, she felt working on Father Mother Sister Brother, was an interesting experience, as she had not witnessed the picture and no idea about the film's script. She recalled on Jarmusch not wanting a musical score for the film but kind of "music, not non-music" as the brief she was provided, which led her to write a sparse and gentle score that accompanied the film.

Besides the score, they recorded cover versions of Jackson Browne and Nico's duet "These Days" and Dusty Springfield's "Spooky".

== Release ==
The soundtrack was announced in October 2025, and preceded by the single "Jetlag". The album was released through Sacred Bones Records on December 24, 2025, in digital and physical formats.

== Reception ==
Damon Wise of Deadline Hollywood called it a "plangent avant-garde guitar score". Nicolas Rapold of Sight and Sound and David Rooney of The Hollywood Reporter called it "warm" and "silky". Matt Zoller Seitz of RogerEbert.com described it a "gently trippy drone-rock and synth-scape score" that stitches the three stories. Ryan Lattanzio of IndieWire called it "a reverb-guitar-driving musical score he wrote himself encouraging you to pause and smell the roses". Ayaan Paul Chowdhury of The Hindu wrote "Throughout, Jarmusch’s own score, written with Anika, wraps the chapters in a low-key shimmer that feels closer to a late-night radio station."

== Track listing ==
No.	Title	Artist(s)	Length
1.	"Spooky"	Anika	2:12
2.	"Disorder"	Jim Jarmusch; Anika	1:01
3.	"Skaters" (Short Version)	Jarmusch; Anika	0:46
4.	"The Lake 1"	Jarmusch; Anika	0:55
5.	"The Lake 2"	Jarmusch; Anika	0:33
6.	"The World in Reverse"	Jarmusch; Anika	1:08
7.	"Afterwards"	Jarmusch; Anika	1:08
8.	"Order"	Jarmusch; Anika	1:10
9.	"Twins"	Jarmusch; Anika	1:15
10.	"Skaters"	Jarmusch; Anika	3:38
11.	"Return"	Jarmusch; Anika	1:35
12.	"Emptiness"	Jarmusch; Anika	0:47
13.	"These Days"	Anika	3:36
14.	"Jetlag"	Jarmusch; Anika	3:43
15.	"Paris Bleu"	Jarmusch; Anika	4:21
16.	"These Days" (Berlin Version)	Anika	3:32
Total length:			31:20
