= Anika (musician) =

British singer-songwriter (born 1987)

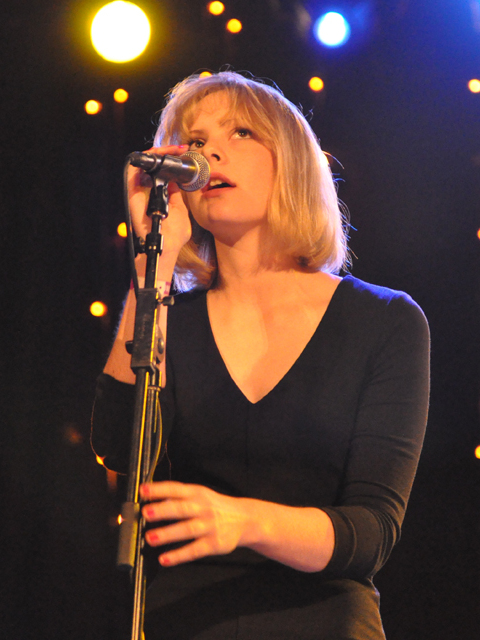
- Anika performing in 2011

Background information
- Born: Annika Henderson; 6 February 1987 (age 39); Surrey, England
- Genres: Dub; electronic; avant-garde; post-punk
- Occupations: Musician; songwriter; record producer; writer; journalist; poet; DJ
- Instruments: Vocals; keys; e-guitar; acoustic guitar; bass
- Labels: Invada Records UK; Sacred Bones; Stones Throw

Anika (born Annika Henderson, 1987) is a British and German singer-songwriter, musician, political journalist and poet.

== Life and career ==
Anika was born in Surrey, England and grew up speaking English and German. Before she began her singing career, Anika worked as a music promoter in Cardiff and political journalist in Berlin.

After meeting producer Geoff Barrow, who was looking for a singer to work with his band Beak, they recorded an album in 12 days with no overdubs. The album was titled Anika, with Anika explaining she chose the name by taking out one letter from her real name as a way to distance herself from it personally.

Anika was released in 2010 by Barrow's Invada imprint in Europe and by Stones Throw Records in the US, and received positive reviews from contemporary critics. According to the music review aggregation of Metacritic, it garnered an average score of 65/100. The album included a number of covers, such as "Yang Yang" by Yoko Ono, "Terry" by Twinkle, "End of the World" by Skeeter Davis, "Masters of War" by Bob Dylan, and "I Go to Sleep" by Ray Davies.

Several songs on Anika found digital success on iTunes. "End of the World" peaked at number seventy-eight on the iTunes Japan Top 100 Alternative Songs, while "Yang Yang" peaked at number sixty-four on the iTunes Spain Top 100 Alternative Songs. "I Go to Sleep" was featured in a prominent scene in the Netflix series Russian Doll.

Anika later formed the band Exploded View, based in Mexico City, along with local musicians/producers, Martin Thulin, Hugo Quezada and Amon Melgarejo, who released their self-titled debut album on Sacred Bones Records in 2016. They later released a follow-up EP on the same label entitled "Summer Came Early," which was said to be a comment on global warming, in November 2017. A second album Obey was released in 2018.

She returned in 2021 with a new Anika album, Change. It received positive reviews from contemporary critics; according to the music review aggregation of Metacritic, it garnered an average score of 79/100. Aquarium Drunkard called it "an album of subtle electronic pop, driving bass lines, and lyrics that veer from quixotic to inspiring". Mxdwn wrote "Quiet, sparse and intimate, Change is another lo-fi, emotionally stark release from Anika, complete with her trademark cushy textures and dreamy melodies.", naming Change as one of their top 50 records of 2021. 7th Level Music described the album as "Dreamy. Sexy. Mysterious. Alluring. Distant. Intimate. Psychedelic. Stylish". The album's first single, "Finger Pies", was chosen by Chanel as the opening track for their Spring-Summer 2022 Ready-to-Wear catwalk show in Paris.

This was followed in 2025 by Abyss, released on Sacred Bones Records. Abyss is a marked a departure from Change, due to its heavier, grunge-influenced sound. Anika listed Hole, The Breeders, and X-Ray Spex as influences on the album.

== Discography ==
=== as Anika ===
Overview of albums and EPs released by Anika
Title	Details
Anika	Released: October 25, 2010 (Europe), November 12, 2010 (United States); Label: Invada (Europe) / Stones Throw Records
Change	Released: July 23, 2021; Label: Invada (Europe) / Sacred Bones Records (United States)
Eat Liquid	Released: June 9th, 2023; Label: Liquid Milk; Specially commissioned for and performed at the Zeiss Major Planetarium in February of the same year.
Abyss	Released: April 4, 2025; Label: Sacred Bones Records

==== EPs ====
- Anika EP (Stones Throw / Invada April 2013)

==== Singles ====
- "Yang Yang" (Stones Throw / Invada 2010)
- "No One's There" (Stones Throw / Invada 2011)
- "99 Red Balloons" Invada Allstars feat. Anika (2016) (charity single for the Anti-Trident Campaign)
- "No More Parties in the Attic" - Exploded View (Sacred Bones - 2016)
- "Finger Pies" (Sacred Bones / Invada 2021)
- "Change" (Sacred Bones / Invada 2021)
- "Rights" (Sacred Bones / Invada 2021)
- "Never Coming Back" (Sacred Bones / Invada 2021)
- "Hearsay" (Sacred Bones 2025)
- "Walk Away" (Sacred Bones 2025)

==== Artist Compositions ====
- Original Composition for the Jil Sander Fall/Winter 2021 Women's Collection documented by Stephen Kidd (Jil Sander - 2021)
- Anika & Jim Jarmusch - Original film score and arrangement of cover versions for the motion picture Father Mother Sister Brother directed by Jim Jarmusch - 2025)

==== Album features ====
- Anika & Camera - 2am (Bureau B - 2014)
- Anika & T.Raumschmiere - Sleeping Pills and Habits (Shitkatapult - 2015)
- Dave Clarke I’m Not Afraid (Feat Anika) (Skint Records 2017) from the Dave Clarke LP The Desecration Of Desire
- Shackleton with Anika - Behind the Glass LP ([Woe To The Septic Heart!] 2017)
- Tricky - Lonely Dancer (Feat Anika) ([False Idols] 2020) from Tricky 2020 EP
- I Like Trains - Eyes To The Left (Feat Anika) (Atlantic Curve 2020) from I Like Trains KOMPROMAT
- 'M Sessions' - Cover versions of Malaria!, Matador and Mania D, with Gudrun Gut. (Monika Enterprise 2021)
- Current Joys - Dancer In the Dark (Cover Version by Anika) (Secretly Canadian 2022) from Current JoysCovers From Across The Sea
- Soundwalk Collective - It's All Breaking Apart (Feat Anika, Elvin Brandhi, Gudrun Gut and Nina Kraviz) (Neuer Berliner Kunstverein 2024)

=== with Exploded View ===
==== Albums ====
- Exploded View - Exploded View (Sacred Bones 2016)
- Exploded View - Obey (Sacred Bones 2018)

==== EPs ====
- Summer Came Early EP - Exploded View (Sacred Bones 2017)
