= Yang Yang (song) =

1973 song by Yoko Ono

Single by Yoko Ono

from the album Approximately Infinite Universe
- A-side: "Death of Samantha"
- Released: 26 February 1973 (US); 4 May 1973 (UK)
- Genre: Rock
- Length: 3:52
- Label: Apple
- Songwriter(s): Yoko Ono
- Producer(s): John Lennon, Yoko Ono

Yoko Ono singles chronology
"Now or Never" (1972)	"Yang Yang" (1973)	"Woman Power" (1973)

"Yang Yang"

Single by Yoko Ono
- Released: 2002
- Genre: Rock, dance
- Label: Parlophone
- Songwriter(s): Yoko Ono
- Producer(s): John Lennon, Yoko Ono

Yoko Ono singles chronology
"Kiss Kiss Kiss" (2002)	"Yang Yang" (2002)	"Walking on Thin Ice" (2003)

"Yang Yang" is a song by Yoko Ono, originally released in 1973 on the album Approximately Infinite Universe, and on the B-side to "Death of Samantha". The song was later included on Ono's compilation albums Walking on Thin Ice and Onobox. In 2002, as part of the ONO remix project, the track was re-released and reached #17 on the US dance charts, nearly 30 years after original release.

== Themes explored ==
The song's titular character, a powerful man who talks to "his world" and to himself by telephone, abuses both the women (whom he "owns") and the men (sending them "pebbles and stones") in his charge. The lyrics deal with feminism, the emotional distance and cruelty sometimes shown by men, and the dehumanizing of both sexes.

== Later critical reception ==
Pitchfork's Jess Harvell stated, "On Orange Factory's 'Down and Dirty' remix of 'Yang Yang', Ono is vocodered into a Troutman-esque gremlin and blurred into an anonymous orgasmic sigh over a brutally functional garage bounce." Dan Rapper, in his review of Open Your Box for PopMatters, opined that the Orange Factory remix "is turned into a straight vocoder-style Ministry of Sound track, its squelching electro already somehow tired-sounding."

== Track listing ==
- Digital download
1. "Yang Yang" (Peter Rauhofer Ying Mix) – 7:36
2. "Yang Yang" (Orange Factory Down & Dirty Mix) – 8:05
3. "Yang Yang" (Peter Rauhofer Yang Mix) – 9:05
4. "Yang Yang" (Orange Factory Pump Mix) – 10:28
5. "Yang Yang" (Peter Rauhofer Yang Dub) – 6:35
6. "Yang Yang" (Orange Factory Down & Dirty Dub) – 6:29

== Charts ==
Chart (2002)	Peak position
US Dance Club Songs (Billboard)	17
US Hot Dance Singles Sales (Billboard)	24

== Anika cover ==
"Yang Yang"

Single by Anika

from the album Anika
- Released: 13 September 2010
- Recorded: 2010
- Genre: Psychedelic rock; dub; disco; funk
- Length: 2:55
- Label: Stones Throw
- Songwriter(s): Yoko Ono
- Producer(s): Geoff Barrow; Beak

Anika singles chronology
"Yang Yang" (2010)	"No One's There" (2011)

Music video
- "Yang Yang" on YouTube

"Yang Yang" was covered by Anika and released as the lead single from her debut album Anika in September 2010. The song was offered as the "Free MP3 of the Day" on Spinner. On her choice to cover the song for her album, Anika explained, "I loved the way the words sounded and as an ex-politics student and political journalist, I thought the song would make a great cover. Yoko Ono is renowned for her political views but I think there was a dark side to the lyrics that the original version had not fully explored."

=== Critical reception ===
Heather Phares from Allmusic described the song as a "fantastic anti-pop single, with klaxon-like synths providing the hook and a bassline so strutting it could have been stolen from a blaxploitation soundtrack." John Doran, in his review for NME, commented, "Just when you thought the post-punk genre had been strip-mined for all potential inspiration, along comes Anika."

Drowned in Sound included Anika's cover of "Yang Yang" on its list Singles of the Year 2010.

=== Music video ===
The music video for Yang Yang was directed by John Minton, who had previously directed music videos for Portishead, Robert Plant, and Amusement Parks on Fire. Shots of cartoon UFOs, Wall Street trading floors, Ronald McDonald, the film Monty Python's Life of Brian, the animated short The Skeleton Dance, and the Earth as seen from outer space are shown throughout the video.

=== Track listing ===
- Digital download
1. "Yang Yang" – 2:55
2. "End of the World" – 2:58
