= Cindy & The Saffrons =

Defunct UK vocal group

Cindy & The Saffrons was a UK vocal group, comprising Joanne Whalley as "Cindy" and Lindsay Neil and Sally Stairs as The Saffrons.

In 1982 at Abbey Road Studios, they recorded a cover of the Shangri-Las' song "Past, Present and Future". It peaked at #56 in the UK Singles Chart in January 1983. The same year their version of "Terry", originally by Twinkle, was released. The group split up soon thereafter, and Whalley concentrated on her career as an actress.
