= Talking to the Universe =

Song by Yoko Ono

from the album Rising
- Released: 18 January 1996
- Genre: Rock
- Length: 3:31
- Label: Capitol
- Songwriter(s): Yoko Ono
- Producer(s): Yoko Ono and Rob Stevens

"Talking to the Universe"

Single by Yoko Ono
- Released: 1 July 2011
- Genre: Rock, Dance
- Label: Mind Train / Twisted
- Songwriter(s): Yoko Ono
- Producer(s): Yoko Ono

Yoko Ono singles chronology
"Move on Fast" (2011)	"Talking to the Universe" (2011)	"She Gets Down on Her Knees" (2012)

"Talking to the Universe" is a song by Yoko Ono, originally released in 1995 on the album Rising.

== Reception ==
In a 2023 article for The Guardian, Alexis Petridis ranked the original album version of "Talking to the Universe" as Yoko Ono's sixteenth best song in her catalog.

== Chart performance ==
The song became Yoko Ono's seventh consecutive number-one hit on the Billboard Hot Dance Club Songs chart and her ninth number-one hit overall.

== Track list ==
Talking to the Universe – single

1. "Talking to the Universe" (Ralphi Rosario vocal mix) – 7:35
2. "Talking to the Universe" (Ralphi Rosario dub mix) – 7:20

Talking to the Universe Remixes

1. "Talking to the Universe" (Ralphi Rosario vocal mix) – 7:37
2. "Talking to the Universe" (Ralphi Rosario dub mix) – 7:22
3. "Talking to the Universe" (Chris the Greek club mix) – 7:58
4. "Talking to the Universe" (Chris the Greek dub mix) – 8:41
5. "Talking to the Universe" (Chris the Greek radio edit) – 3:37
6. "Talking to the Universe" (The Perry Twins mix) – 7:47
7. "Talking to the Universe" (Tony Marinos club mix) – 6:51
8. "Talking to the Universe" (Tony Marinos dub mix) – 6:51

Talking to the Universe Remixes Part 2

1. "Talking to the Universe" (Yiannis Sympan mix) – 7:14
2. "Talking to the Universe" (Yiannis Kosmos dub mix) – 6:42
3. "Talking to the Universe" (Yiannis Sympan radio edit) – 3:38
4. "Talking to the Universe" (Richard Morel vocal mix) – 8:07
5. "Talking to the Universe" (Richard Morel dub) – 7:52
6. "Talking to the Universe" (Richard Morel radio edit) – 4:33
7. "Talking to the Universe" (Chris Cox club mix) – 7:19
8. "Talking to the Universe" (Chris Cox dub) – 6:49
9. "Talking to the Universe" (Chris Cox radio edit) – 3:34
10. "Talking to the Universe" (Juan Maclean Acid Attack mix) – 5:13
11. "Talking to the Universe" (Juan Maclean Acid dub mix) – 7:07

Talking to the Universe Remixes Part 3

1. "Talking to the Universe" (Dave Aude club mix) – 6:37
2. "Talking to the Universe" (Dave Aude dub mix) – 6:07
3. "Talking to the Universe" (Dave Aude radio edit) – 3:50
4. "Talking to the Universe" (Dave Aude instrumental) – 6:37
5. "Talking to the Universe" (Eddie Amador remix) – 6:32
6. "Talking to the Universe" (Eddie Amador Listen To Yoko dub) – 6:47
7. "Talking to the Universe" (Yoko Ono She Didn't Harlum Muzip dub) – 6:11
8. "Talking to the Universe" (Yoko Ono She Didn't Harlum Muzip Dubstrumental) – 6:11

== Charts ==
=== Weekly charts ===
Chart (2011)	Position
US Hot Dance Club Songs (Billboard)	1
Global Dance Tracks (Billboard)	38

=== Year-end charts ===
Chart (2011)	Position
US Hot Dance Club Songs (Billboard)	28

== See also ==
- List of number-one dance singles of 2011 (U.S.)
