= No, No, No (Yoko Ono song) =

- 7" single artwork

Single by Yoko Ono

from the album Season of Glass
- B-side: "Will You Touch Me" (1981); "Nobody Sees Me Like You Do" (2022)
- Released: August 1981
- Recorded: 1981
- Studio: The Hit Factory, New York City
- Genre: New wave; rock
- Length: 2:43
- Label: Geffen
- Songwriter: Yoko Ono
- Producers: Yoko Ono, Phil Spector

Yoko Ono singles chronology
"Walking on Thin Ice" (1981)	"No, No, No" (1981)	"Goodbye Sadness" (1981)
"You're the One" (2007)	"No, No, No" (2007)	"Give Peace a Chance" (2008)

Alternative cover
- 2008 digital single artwork

"No, No, No" is a song by Yoko Ono from her 1981 album Season of Glass and was released as a single in August 1981.

== Background ==
The song is one of the most dramatic tracks on the album to address her husband John Lennon's murder. The song begins with the sound of four gunshots (Lennon was shot four times) and Ono screaming.

The single version was longer than the album version and included a spoken word section of Sean Ono-Lennon recalling a story his father told him which was previously included on the album track "Even When You're Far Away". The B-side was "Will You Touch Me". The 12" single instead contained "Dogtown", "I Don't Know Why" and "She Gets Down on Her Knees" on the b-side.

== Reception ==
On the release of the 12-inch single with 4 songs selected from Season of Glass, Billboard magazine commented that "Yoko has found her niche in the industry for her inimitable brand of music" and noted that "her off beat approach seems tempered down resulting in a more commercially appealing format".

Ultimate Classic Rock critic Michael Gallucci rated it as Ono's 7th best song, saying that it is "one of the album's most powerful tracks."

== Re-releases ==
In January 2008, the song reached No. 1 on the United States Billboard Hot Dance Club Play chart. The artist credit was listed as simply "Ono" making the artist-title combination a palindrome ("onononono").

A digital single of new house remixes was released by Ono through Twisted Records and made available exclusively on Beatport from June 1, 2008.

The single was re-released in 2022 as a double A-side with "Nobody Sees Me Like You Do" on digital and streaming services via Secretly Canadian.

== Track listing ==
All songs were written by Ono.

US 7" single (1981)
A1. "No, No, No" (Single Version) – 3:37
B1. "Will You Touch Me" – 2:37

US 12" single (1981)
A1. "No, No, No" (Single Version) – 3:37
B1. "Dogtown" – 3:14
B2. "I Don't Know Why" – 3:59
B3. "She Gets Down on Her Knees" – 4:03

Digital download (2008)

1. "No, No, No" (Linus Loves Hyped Dub Mix) – 6:31
2. "No, No, No" (Linus Loves Hyped Vocal Mix) – 6:31
3. "No, No, No" (Tom Novy Vocal Mix) – 7:22
4. "No, No, No" (Tom Novy Dub) – 7:04
5. "No, No, No" (Eric Kupper Vocal Mix) – 8:04
6. "No, No, No" (Eric Kupper Dub) – 8:03
7. "No, No, No" (Friscia & Lamboy Vocal Mix) – 9:49
8. "No, No, No" (Friscia & Lamboy Dub) – 9:05
9. "No, No, No" (Peter Bailey Dub) – 7:46
10. "No, No, No" (Mike Cruz Dub) – 9:46
11. "No, No, No" (Lindbergh Palace Recub) – 7:02
12. "No, No, No" (Double B No...Well, Yes Vocal Mix) – 6:56

Digital download (2022)

1. "No, No, No" (Album version) - 2:44
2. "Nobody Sees Me Like You Do" (Album version) - 3:33

== Charts ==
=== Weekly charts ===
Chart (2008)	Peak position
US Dance Club Songs (Billboard)	1
Global Dance Tracks (Billboard)	37

=== Year-end charts ===
Chart (2008)	Position
US Hot Dance Club Songs (Billboard)	4

=== Decade-end charts ===
Chart (2000–09)	Position
US Hot Dance Club Songs (Billboard)	4
