= Father Mother Sister Brother =

2025 film by Jim Jarmusch

- American theatrical release poster
- Directed by: Jim Jarmusch
- Written by: Jim Jarmusch
- Produced by: Charles Gillibert; Joshua Astrachan; Carter Logan; Atilla Salih Yücer
- Starring: Tom Waits; Adam Driver; Mayim Bialik; Charlotte Rampling; Cate Blanchett; Vicky Krieps; Sarah Greene; Indya Moore; Luka Sabbat
- Cinematography: Frederick Elmes; Yorick Le Saux
- Edited by: Affonso Gonçalves
- Music by: Jim Jarmusch; Anika
- Production companies: Saint Laurent Productions; Badjetlag; CG Cinéma; The Apartment Pictures; Fremantle; Les Films du Losange; Weltkino; Cinema Inutile; Fis Éirann / Screen Ireland; Hail Mary Pictures
- Distributed by: Mubi (Select territories); Les Films du Losange (France); Lucky Red (Italy); Weltkino (Germany)
- Release dates: August 31, 2025 (Venice); December 18, 2025 (Italy); December 24, 2025 (United States); January 7, 2026 (France); February 26, 2026 (Germany); April 10, 2026 (United Kingdom and Ireland)
- Running time: 111 minutes
- Countries: United States; Ireland; France; Italy; Japan; Germany
- Languages: English; French
- Box office: $8.3 million

Father Mother Sister Brother is a 2025 comedy-drama anthology film written and directed by Jim Jarmusch. It follows three estranged family relationships in three different countries around the world, starring an ensemble cast that includes Tom Waits, Adam Driver, Mayim Bialik, Charlotte Rampling, Cate Blanchett, Vicky Krieps, Sarah Greene, Indya Moore, and Luka Sabbat.

The film premiered in the main competition of the 82nd Venice International Film Festival on August 31, 2025, where it won the Golden Lion. It was theatrically released in the United States by Mubi on December 24, and was released in France by Les Films du Losange on January 7, 2026.

== Plot ==
=== "Father" ===
Somewhere in a countryside town in the United States, Jeff and Emily drive down a snowy road to a reunion with their estranged and reclusive father. While Emily has no idea how he has enough money to survive without social security following the passing of their mother, Jeff appears to be secretly supporting him. Further concerned with his loneliness, Jeff brings a box full of expensive groceries.

The father appears to hide his real financial state, displaying an old pickup truck in the front yard and purposefully messing up the living room, until Emily spots a Rolex on his wrist, although he pretends it is a "fugazi" (fake replica). Seeming not to care about their lives, he forgets about Jeff's recent divorce. After their departure, the father tidies up the house, cleans up his appearance, and drives in his actual, pristine functional car (a BMW hidden under a car cover) to meet a female friend for an expensive dinner at a nearby restaurant.

=== "Mother" ===
Somewhere in Dublin, an elderly famous writer awaits her annual tea gathering with her two daughters, Timothea and Lilith. The reunion marks the only day in the year they actually see each other, although they all live in Dublin.

Timothea's car malfunctions on the way, and in despair she contacts roadside assistance, but then manages to get the car running again and changes her mind, driving to her mother's home to avoid being late. Lilith asks her friend, Jeanette, to pretend she is an Uber driver, avoiding further explanations of her financial state to her mother and sister.

During the tea, the mother inquires about their lives, and after some hesitation Timothea announces that she has been promoted to a new position on the city's council for preservation of historic buildings. However, she is interrupted by Lilith, who announces she also has good news about the new "influencers" of her community, although neither her mother or her sister appears to know what an influencer is.

Lilith is spotted with a Rolex, but insists it is a fake replica. In the bathroom, Timothea appears to be overwhelmed by emotion. As the tea ends, despite Timothea offering to drive her, Lilith—claiming her app is not working—insists that her mother call an Uber, and the trio waits for the car in silence by the front door.

=== "Sister Brother" ===
Somewhere in Paris, Skye and her brother Billy reunite following the passing of their parents in a plane crash in the Azores. While driving to their old home, they try to reconnect through memories. At the now empty apartment, Billy shares with Skye old photos, drawings of their childhood, and an old Rolex of their father's, as well as multiple fake IDs and a fake marriage certificate.

The landlord, Madame Gautier, interrupts them, revealing that she personally prevented the insurance company from seizing their parents' belongings, even though they died owing three months of rent. Driving through Paris once again, they head to a warehouse, taking a final look at their parents' old furniture.

== Cast ==
=== "Father" ===
- Tom Waits as Father
- Adam Driver as Jeff
- Mayim Bialik as Emily

=== "Mother" ===
- Charlotte Rampling as Mother (Catherine Russell)
- Cate Blanchett as Timothea
- Vicky Krieps as Lilith
- Sarah Greene as Jeanette

=== "Sister Brother" ===
- Indya Moore as Skye
- Luka Sabbat as Billy
- Françoise Lebrun as Madame Gautier

== Production ==
=== Development ===
At the Outlook Festival in April 2023, Jarmusch said he was working on a new film that was "very subtle ... very quiet…Funny and sad". He hinted that it may not have any music. In November 2023, it was reported that the title of the film would be Father Mother Sister Brother. It is produced by Exoskeleton with Animal Kingdom and CG Cinema.

=== Casting ===
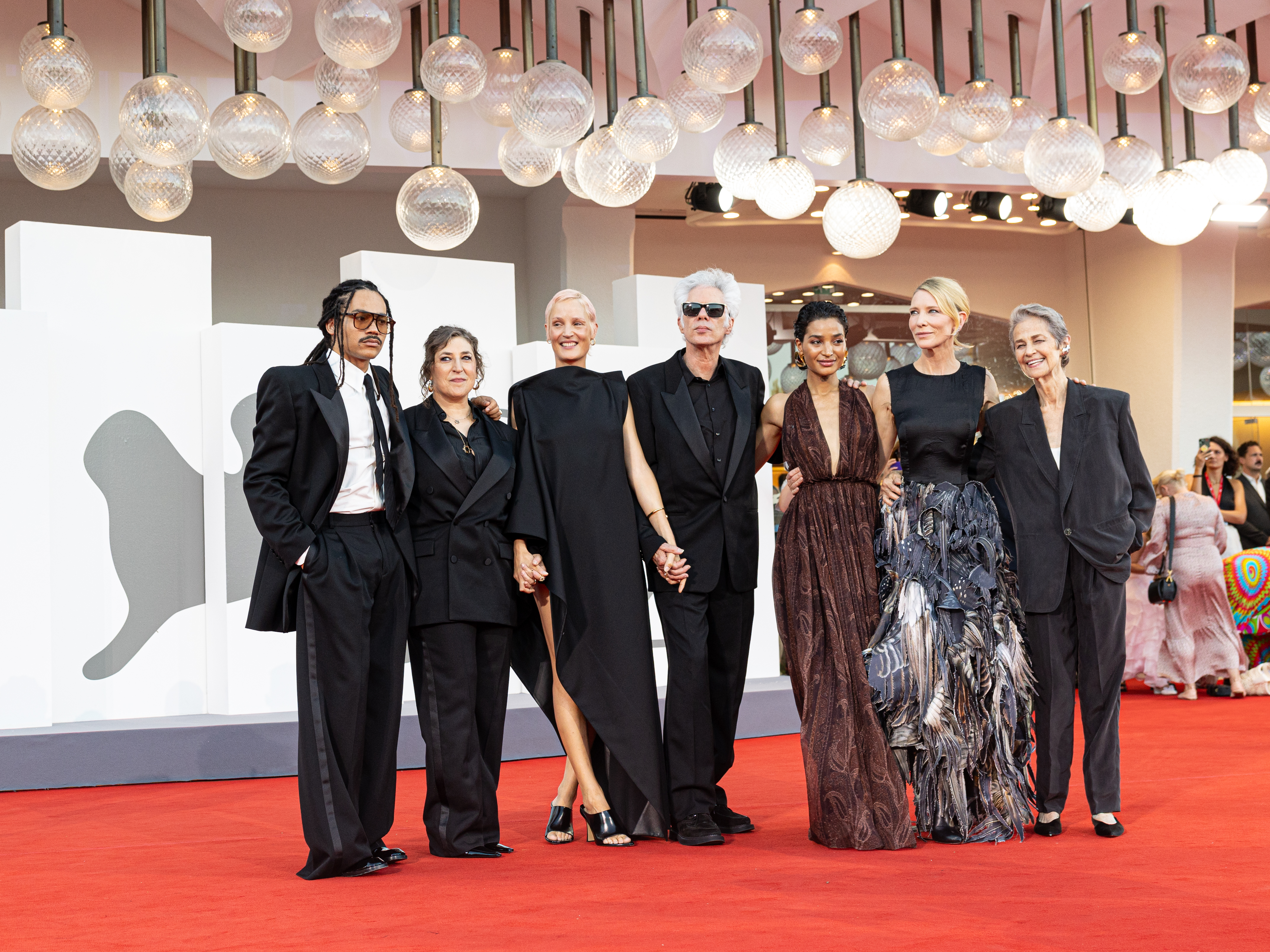
Cast during the 82nd Venice International Film Festival

In December 2023, Cate Blanchett was cast. In January 2024, set photos showed Vicky Krieps in costume on set. In May, Adam Driver, Mayim Bialik, Tom Waits, Charlotte Rampling, Indya Moore and Luka Sabbat joined the cast.

=== Filming ===
Principal photography began in November 2023 in West Milford, New Jersey. Filming took place in Dublin in early 2024. The film wrapped in Paris in early 2024.

=== Music ===
Jarmusch co-composed the score with singer-songwriter Anika.

== Release ==
At SXSW London in June 2025, Efe Cakarel, the CEO of streaming service and distributor Mubi, announced that Father Mother Sister Brother would premiere at the 2025 Venice Film Festival. The film premiered at the festival on August 31, where it won the Golden Lion. It was Jarmusch's first entry at the Venice main competition.

The film had its North American premiere as the centerpiece film of the 2025 New York Film Festival. It was first theatrically released in Italy on December 18. It was then theatrically released in the U.S. by Mubi on December 24, and was released in France by Les Films du Losange on January 7, 2026. The German release was on February 26. The film had its Scottish premiere on February 27, 2026 at Glasgow Film Festival, and was released in the United Kingdom and Ireland on April 10. The film was released on MUBI's streaming platform on February 27, 2026.

== Reception ==
=== Critical response ===
On the review aggregator website Rotten Tomatoes, 82% of 145 critics' reviews are positive, with an average rating of 7/10. The website's consensus reads: "Father Mother Sister Brother is a subtly haunting, wryly funny, and visually poised triptych that transforms the banal awkwardness of family life into a bittersweet meditation on the bonds that persist." Metacritic, which uses a weighted average, assigned the film a score of 76 out of 100, based on 34 critics, indicating "generally favorable" reviews.

Matthew Joseph Jenner from the International Cinephile Society called it "one of the year’s most lovely, gentle films”, awarding it four stars out of five. Matt Zoller Seitz of RogerEbert.com wrote: "The constant through all of Jarmusch’s work is an attentiveness to narrative and visual storytelling that most other filmmakers avoid or just never include. It’s unsettling, in a way—as if the normal experience of moviegoing has been turned inside-out. You may be left cold, feeling that you’ve seen a theoretical exercise whose purpose was never articulated. Or you may react [...]" Richard Brody of The New Yorker wrote that "despite the scope of the film’s implications, despite its clarity, cleverness, and contemplative splendor, Father Mother Sister Brother is a minor achievement, a wise and empathetic divertimento—frank and straightforward, tonally moderate, technically undemanding, neither enraged nor outrageous. With the film’s relative modesty, Jarmusch is tuning up—while also retuning the world of cinema, its critics and its viewers, to his own distinctive note and preparing them for his higher harmonics to come". Ben Kenigsberg of The New York Times wrote: "Father Mother Sister Brother isn’t a culminating achievement, not least compared to Paterson (2016) less than a decade ago. Mellow even by Jarmusch standards, the new film finds the writer-director returning to his familiar anthology mode. It combines the triptych structure of Mystery Train (1989), in which three disparate sets of characters crossed paths at a fleabag hotel in Memphis, and the globe-hopping conceit of Night on Earth (1991), which observed five cab rides in five cities".

Peter Bradshaw of The Guardian wrote that "there is a contentment and calm here, an acceptance and a Zen simplicity that is a cleansing of the moviegoing palate, or perhaps the fiction-consuming palate in general. It is a film to savour". Bilge Ebiri of Vulture wrote: "Father Mother Sister Brother is a simple, quiet movie, one that works the mundane in ways that might remind one of such Jarmusch masterpieces as Paterson (2016) and maybe even Stranger Than Paradise (1984), though it’s much more stripped down and oblique". Casey Epstein-Gross of Paste wrote: "Jarmusch’s precision is as sharp as ever in this empathetic triptych, but the life inside it feels diagrammed rather than lived". Tim Grierson of Los Angeles Times wrote: "The movie glides by so unassumingly, you may be stunned how moved you are by the end". David Rooney of The Hollywood Reporter wrote: "This is a unique portrait of families and their foibles, both amusing and annoying, superbly acted by an exceptional cast fully inhabiting their characters [...] Like Paterson, it’s a film whose simplicity, sweetness and unvarnished ordinariness make it seem almost a miracle".

Jessica Kiang of Variety wrote: "Jarmusch gets to extend his quick, quiet interest and his compassion, in both directions, to the older and the younger generation, at once. But it also sets up the gently gorgeous Father Mother Sister Brother to alight on the surprisingly practicable conclusion that, aside from loving and raising them the best you can, maybe the most rewarding thing you can do for your kids is bequeath to them a bunch of little secrets that hint at the richness of the life you lived out of their sight". Nicolas Rapold of Sight and Sound stated: "What Jarmusch has called his “quiet film” speaks with clarity as one from the heart". Keith Uhlich of Slant Magazine wrote: "Of all the recurrences in Father Mother Sister Brother, this one feels especially key to unpacking the intentions of its creator. Watching a Jarmusch film can be like gazing upon a madman’s conspiracy board, which to those not on board with all the laconic lyricism can be exasperating. But get on the wavelength and it’s as if you’ve gained entry into a secret society—one that sees through the despairing illusions of existence to the blissfully beating heart beneath".

Ryan Lattanzio of IndieWire wrote: "Father Mother Sister Brother is about as dry as a physical copy of short stories you’ve loved since you were a child. There are no protagonists or antagonists, just people moving through life, Jarmusch catching moments of them the way that David Lynch once caught ideas like fish moving down a stream. This is a movie Lynch would’ve admired, brittly funny and content to linger in doorways and thresholds for as long as it takes until somebody breaks the awkward silence". Zachary Barnes of The Wall Street Journal wrote that "though, Father Mother Sister Brother is no doubt true enough to many a family gathering this Christmas—awkward, amusing, a bit dissatisfying, but not a disaster. Sometimes that’s reason enough to call for a toast". Phil de Semiyen of Time Out wrote: "Not top tier Jarmusch, but still a funny, soulful anthology worth seeking out".

=== Accolades ===
| Award | Date of ceremony | Category | Recipient(s) | Result | Ref. |
|---|---|---|---|---|---|
| Venice International Film Festival | September 6, 2025 | Golden Lion | Jim Jarmusch | Won | |
| Gotham Independent Film Awards | December 1, 2025 | Outstanding Supporting Performance | Indya Moore | Nominated | |
| National Board of Review Awards | January 13, 2026 | Top 10 Independent Films | Father Mother Sister Brother | Won | |
