= You're the One (Yoko Ono song) =

1984 song by Yoko Ono

Song by Yoko Ono

from the album Milk and Honey
- Released: 27 January 1984
- Recorded: 1982
- Genre: Electropop
- Length: 3:56
- Label: Polydor
- Songwriter: Yoko Ono
- Producer: Yoko Ono

"You're the One"

Single by Yoko Ono

from the album Open Your Box
- Released: 19 June 2007
- Length: 24:34 (CD single)
- Label: Astralwerks (CD single); Mind Train; Twisted Records
- Songwriter: Yoko Ono
- Producer: Yoko Ono

Yoko Ono singles chronology
"Everyman... Everywoman..." (2004)	"You're the One" (2007)	"No, No, No" (2007)

"You're the One" is a song by Yoko Ono, originally released in 1984 on Ono's and John Lennon's duet album Milk and Honey. The song was also on the compilation albums Onobox and Walking on Thin Ice.

== Composition ==
The song's lyrics compare John Lennon and Yoko's Ono's relationship to be viewed by society as Laurel and Hardy, but viewed by the couple as Heathcliff and Catherine Earnshaw from Wuthering Heights.

== Critical reception ==
Robert Christgau, in his review of Milk and Honey, stated that "You're the One" and its "cricket synthesizers," along with Ono's song "Sleepless Night", "are confident personal elaborations of a tradition she comes to secondhand."

== Track listing ==
CD single

1. "You're the One" (Claude Le Gache Vocal Mix) – 7:33
2. "You're the One" (Morel's Pink Noise Vocal Mix) – 7:33
3. "You're the One" (Fricia & Lamboy Tribal Dub) – 9:28
- Digital download (Vocal Mixes)
1. "You're the One" (Bimbo Jones Vocal Mix) – 7:06
2. "You're the One" (Bimbo Jones Dub) – 7:04
3. "You're the One" (Morel’s Pink Noise Vocal Mix) – 7:33
4. "You're the One" (Morel’s Pink Noise Dub) – 8:22
5. "You're the One" (Claude Le Gache Vocal Mix) – 7:32
6. "You're the One" (Claude Le Gache Mixshow Edit) – 6:08
7. "You're the One" (Claude Le Gache Dub) – 7:33
8. "You're the One" (Friscia & Lamboy Tribal Dub) – 9:28

== Charts ==
=== Weekly charts ===
Chart (2007)	Peak position
US Dance Club Songs (Billboard)	2
Global Dance Tracks (Billboard)	36

=== Year-end charts ===
Chart (2007)	Peak position
US Hot Dance Club Songs (Billboard)	7

== Personnel ==
- John Lennon – guitar, keyboards, vocals
- Yoko Ono – vocals
- Peter Cannarozzi – synthesizer
