= Friscia & Lamboy =

American electronic music duo

- Origin: United States
- Genres: Electronic
- Years active: 2002-present
- Members: Glenn Friscia; Frank Lamboy

Friscia & Lamboy are an American electronic music duo. In 2003, they did a remix for Cher's single "Love One Another", in 2004 they remixed Britney Spears's single "Outrageous" and in 2007 remixed Ashley Tisdale's single "He Said She Said". Their song, "Deep Into Your Soul", hit #1 on the US Billboard Dance charts in September 2007. The song ranked at #26 on Billboard's year-end dance chart for 2007.

== Remixes ==
- Cher - "Love One Another" (2003)
- Britney Spears - "Outrageous" (2004)
- Nadia - "Its Gonna Take Time" (2005)
- Ashley Tisdale - "He Said She Said" (2007)
- Britney Spears - "Gimme More" (2007)
- Nelly Furtado - "Say It Right" (2007)
- Hans Zimmer - "He's a Pirate" (2007)
- Yoko Ono - "You’re the One" (2007)
- Danity Kane - "Damaged" (2008)
- Britney Spears - "Piece of Me" (2008)
- Britney Spears - "Break the Ice" (2008)
- Blog 27 - "Cute (I'm Not Cute)" (2008)
- Britney Spears - "Radar" (2008)
- Mariah Carey - "Obsessed" (2009)
- Cybersutra - "I Believe" (2009)
- Selena Gomez & The Scene - "A Year Without Rain" (2010)
- Britney Spears - "Till the World Ends" (2011)
