= Terry (Twinkle song) =

Single by Twinkle
- A-side: "Terry"
- B-side: "The Boy of My Dreams"
- Released: 1964
- Genre: Pop
- Label: Decca
- Songwriter: Twinkle
- Producer: Tommy Scott

Twinkle singles chronology
"Terry" (1964)	"Golden Lights" (1965)

"Terry" is the debut single by British singer Lynn Ripley, who performed under the name Twinkle. It reached number 4 on the UK Singles Chart in December 1964, spending a total of fifteen weeks on the charts. The track also reached number 5 on the Canadian charts, spending four weeks in the top 40 in February 1965, and number 2 on the Hong Kong charts in March 1965.

The song is about the death of a young man named Terry, killed in a motorcycle accident. It was banned by both the BBC, and by ITV's Ready Steady Go! on grounds of taste (the last line, "Please wait at the gates of heaven for me, Terry" indicated the intention of suicide), but despite (or possibly because of) this, it shot up the charts. It was Twinkle's only top 10 hit, although her follow-up, "Golden Lights" (later covered by the Smiths), reached number 21 in the UK.

== Cover versions ==
Claude François released a French version of "Terry" on his 1965 EP Les Choses De La Maison. In 1986, the song was sung by Mandy Smith, for inclusion on her debut album, but was unreleased until 2009. In 2010, Anika included a cover of the song on her debut album Anika.

== Reception ==
AllMusic described "Terry" as "magnificent — Phil Spector meets The Shangri-Las on a rain-slicked English back-road" — and said that it "should have set up Twinkle for never-ending fame".
