= She Gets Down on Her Knees =

Song and single by Yoko Ono

Song by Yoko Ono

from the album A Story
- Released: July 1997
- Recorded: 1974
- Length: 4:50
- Label: Rykodisc
- Songwriter(s): Yoko Ono
- Producer(s): Yoko Ono, David Spinozza

"She Gets Down on Her Knees"

Song by Yoko Ono

from the album Season of Glass
- Released: 8 June 1981
- Recorded: 1981
- Studio: The Hit Factory, New York City
- Length: 4:13
- Label: Geffen
- Songwriter(s): Yoko Ono
- Producer(s): Yoko Ono, Phil Spector

"She Gets Down on Her Knees"

Single by Yoko Ono
- Released: 7 February 2012
- Genre: Rock; dance
- Label: Mind Train / Twisted
- Producer(s): Yoko Ono

Yoko Ono singles chronology
"Talking to the Universe" (2011)	"She Gets Down on Her Knees" (2012)	"I'm Moving On" (2012)

"She Gets Down on Her Knees" is a song by Yoko Ono. It was initially recorded for 1974's A Story (not released until 1997), and later re-recorded for 1981's Season of Glass. An acoustic demo version of the song was included on a reissue of Approximately Infinite Universe. The original version was later released as part of 1992's Onobox box set and Walking on Thin Ice greatest-hits.

== Track listing ==
- Remixes Part 1
1. "She Gets Down On Her Knees" (Ralphi club mix) – 8:11
2. "She Gets Down On Her Knees" (Ralphi dub mix) – 8:11
3. "She Gets Down On Her Knees" (Ralphi radio edit) – 3:55
4. "She Gets Down On Her Knees" (Rich Morel Vox mix) – 8:05
5. "She Gets Down On Her Knees" (Rich Morel dub mix) – 6:39
6. "She Gets Down On Her Knees" (Yiannis Alluring French Kiss mix) – 9:38
7. "She Gets Down On Her Knees" (Yiannis Alluring French Kiss edit) – 7:33
8. "She Gets Down On Her Knees" (Yiannis Alluring French Kiss radio mix) – 4:31
- Remixes Part 2
1. "She Gets Down On Her Knees" (Jochen Simms club mix) – 6:32
2. "She Gets Down On Her Knees" (Jochen Simms dub mix) – 6:35
3. "She Gets Down On Her Knees" (Craven Moore's Head mix) – 7:42
4. "She Gets Down On Her Knees" (Craven Moore's Heart-Beat mix) – 5:09
5. "She Gets Down On Her Knees" (Dave Aude club mix) – 6:58
6. "She Gets Down On Her Knees" (Dave Aude dub mix) – 6:57
7. "She Gets Down On Her Knees" (Penguin Prison remix) – 6:02
8. "She Gets Down On Her Knees" (Penguin Prison dub) – 6:02
9. "She Gets Down On Her Knees" (Mike Cruz club mix) – 8:11
10. "She Gets Down On Her Knees" (Mike Cruz instrumental) – 8:11

== Charts ==
=== Weekly charts ===
Chart (2012)	Position
US Hot Dance Club Songs (Billboard)	5
Global Dance Tracks (Billboard)	36
