= Season of Glass (album) =

Studio album by Yoko Ono
- Released: 3 June 1981
- Recorded: 1981
- Studios: The Hit Factory, New York City
- Genre: Pop rock
- Length: 51:05
- Label: Geffen
- Producers: Yoko Ono; Phil Spector

Yoko Ono chronology
| Double Fantasy (1980) | Season of Glass (1981) | It's Alright (I See Rainbows) (1982) |

Singles from Season of Glass
- 1. "No, No, No" Released: August 1981 (US); 2. "Goodbye Sadness" Released: October 1981 (US)

Season of Glass is the fifth studio album by Japanese musician Yoko Ono, her first solo recording after the murder of her husband John Lennon. Season of Glass, released in 1981, reached number 49 on the US Billboard 200 albums chart, making it Ono's highest-charting solo album to date.

A music video was created for "Goodbye Sadness" featuring footage of Lennon and Ono together. The video was screened on the first episode of Saturday Night Live's seventh season.

== Background ==
The album was released less than six months after Lennon's death and deals with it directly in songs such as "Goodbye Sadness" and "I Don't Know Why". Lennon and Ono's son Sean Lennon features on "Even When You're Far Away", recounting a story his father used to tell him.

The front cover depicts the glasses Lennon was wearing on the day of his murder next to a half-filled glass of water, against a backdrop of Central Park. The choice of album cover was considered controversial by the record company:

I used a photo I took of John's blood-stained glasses on the record cover. The record company called me and said the record shops would not stock the record unless I changed the cover. I didn't understand it. Why? They said it was in bad taste. I felt like a person soaked in blood coming into a living room full of people and reporting that my husband was dead, his body was taken away, and the pair of glasses were the only thing I had managed to salvage – and people looking at me saying it was in bad taste to show the glasses to them. "I'm not changing the cover. This is what John is now," I said.

— Yoko Ono

In contrast, the rear cover has the eyeglasses replaced with a potted geranium and the drinking glass is full of water.

== Reception ==
=== Commercial Performance ===
Season of Glass charted at number 49 on the Billboard 200, making it Ono's highest-charting solo album to date. The songs "Mindweaver" and "Goodbye Sadness" received medium airplay on the Santa Rosa station KHTH soon after the album's release.

The chart performance of Season of Glass, along with Ono's single "Walking on Thin Ice", resulted in her being ranked 37th among female artists for the year 1981 for performance on the Hot 100 and Billboard 200 charts.

=== Critical reception ===
Professional ratings
Review scores
| Source | Rating |
|---|---|
| AllMusic | 4.5/5 stars |
| Robert Christgau | A− |
| Pitchfork | 7.7/10 (1999); 8.8/10 (2023) |
| Rolling Stone | 4/5 stars |
| Uncut | 4/5 stars |

Billboard magazine gave the album a positive review, describing the album as Ono's "reaffirmation in life", containing a sense that she will "brave the crisis". Billboard also described the album as having "a minimum of quirks" and sounded more commercial than any of her previous albums. The songs "I Don't Know Why", "Goodbye Sadness", "Turn of the Wheel" and "She Gets Down on Her Knees" were chosen as the best cuts from the album.

UK trade magazine Record Business noted that Season of Glass confirmed reviewers' first impressions of Double Fantasy that Ono was "writing and performing outstanding material". Record Business noted how "strident, assured and confident" Yoko's voice had become, as well as the "excellent" musicianship shown on the album, with "tasteful saxophone breaks" and "echoes of Morricone".

Music journalist Robert Christgau stated that "damn near every song [on the album] is affecting". He described the transition from the "retrospective irony" of "Extension 33" to the "cut-off vulnerability" of "No, No, No" as "positively gut-wrenching".

In a review for the 1997 reissue, Ryan Schreiber of Pitchfork called the album "a landmark in musical history" that "[encapsulated] Yoko's sadness" as well as the sadness felt around the world by John Lennon's death. He added that the album showcased Ono's "remarkable strength" and described the bonus demo recording of "I Don't Know Why" on the reissue as "harrowing".

In 2018, Pitchfork listed Season of Glass as one of the best 200 albums of the 1980s.

Pitchfork reviewed the album a second time in 2023, giving it a higher score of 8.8 compared to the website's original 7.7 score in their 1997 review. Jayson Greene described the album as a "survivor's statement" and the song "I Don't Know Why" as "harrowing and plainspoken" and "Goodbye Sadness" as "heart-rending". He noted that the songs "Goodbye Sadness", "Toyboat", "Silver Horse" and "Mother of the Universe" featured Ono singing "gorgeous, long-breathed melodies [...] while the music gently rocks and sways". Greene stated that the songs on Season of Glass were "lullabies to hope, delivered with the beatific calm of a dying opera heroine's final aria". He did however feel that the omission of "Walking on Thin Ice" was "like a glitch in the historical record" and should have had a place on the album.

=== Reissues ===
The 1997 Rykodisc reissue added bonus tracks of the single "Walking on Thin Ice" and an a cappella demo of "I Don't Know Why", recorded the day after Lennon's death. Demos of Season of Glass songs recorded with Lennon in the 1970s were also released as bonus tracks with other Ono reissues, including acoustic versions of and "Dogtown" and "She Gets Down on Her Knees" on Approximately Infinite Universe, "Will You Touch Me" on Fly and "Extension 33" on A Story. The unreleased 1974 album A Story also contained several songs that were later re-recorded for Season of Glass, namely "Dogtown", "She Gets Down on Her Knees" and "Will You Touch Me". It was also released by Rykodisc in 1997.

Season of Glass was released to streaming on July 17, 2026. The album is also to be reissued on physical media on August 1, 2026 by Secretly Canadian/Chimera Music, as announced on Ono's 93rd birthday (February 18, 2026). Physical formats will be compact disc, standard black vinyl LP and limited edition white vinyl LP. Digital and CD releases will include three bonus tracks: the 1981 single "Walking on Thin Ice", the demo version of "I Don't Know Why" previously included on the Rykodisc reissue, and an alternate Phil Spector mix of "Dogtown", which is previously unreleased.

== Remixes ==
Three songs from this recording were reworked by other artists on the remix tribute album Yes, I'm a Witch in 2007. Anohni reworked "Toyboat", The Apples in Stereo reworked "Nobody Sees Me Like You Do" and Jason Pierce from Spiritualized reworked "Walking on Thin Ice".

== In popular culture ==
Holly Miranda covered "Nobody Sees Me Like You Do" as a B-side to her single "Forest Green, Oh Forest Green" and on her EP Choose to See, which was included with the purchase of her 2010 album The Magician's Private Library.

== Track listing ==
All tracks are written by Yoko Ono.

Side one
| No. | Title | Length |
|---|---|---|
| 1. | "Goodbye Sadness" | 3:48 |
| 2. | "Mindweaver" | 4:24 |
| 3. | "Even When You're Far Away" | 4:12 |
| 4. | "Nobody Sees Me Like You Do" | 3:31 |
| 5. | "Turn of the Wheel" | 2:41 |
| 6. | "Dogtown" | 3:22 |
| 7. | "Silver Horse" | 3:03 |

Side two
| No. | Title | Length |
|---|---|---|
| 8. | "I Don't Know Why" | 4:18 |
| 9. | "Extension 33" | 2:45 |
| 10. | "No, No, No" | 2:43 |
| 11. | "Will You Touch Me" | 2:37 |
| 12. | "She Gets Down on Her Knees" | 4:13 |
| 13. | "Toyboat" | 3:31 |
| 14. | "Mother of the Universe" | 4:26 |

1997 CD reissue bonus tracks
| No. | Title | Length |
|---|---|---|
| 15. | "Walking on Thin Ice" (Extended version) | 6:55 |
| 16. | "I Don't Know Why" (Demo) | 2:11 |

2026 reissue bonus tracks
| No. | Title | Length |
|---|---|---|
| 15. | "Walking on Thin Ice" | 7:00 |
| 16. | "I Don't Know Why" (Demo) | 2:12 |
| 17. | "Dogtown" (Alternate Version) | 3:42 |

Original UK pressings of the album were bundled with a copy of the "Walking on Thin Ice" single.

== Personnel ==
- Yoko Ono – vocals, cover photography, design
- John Lennon – guitar, keyboards
- Sean Ono Lennon – "A little story"
- Hugh McCracken – guitar, Jew's harp on "Dogtown"
- Earl Slick – guitar
- George Small – keyboards
- Tony Levin – bass guitar
- John Siegler – bass guitar on "Mindweaver" and "Mother of the Universe"
- Andy Newmark – drums
- Arthur Jenkins Jr. – percussion
- David Friedman – percussion, vibraphone
- George "Young" Opalisky – soprano and alto saxophone
- Michael Brecker – tenor saxophone
- Ronnie Cuber – baritone saxophone
- Howard Johnson – tuba
- Tony Davilio – conductor, keyboards; guitar on "No, No, No" and "Toyboat"

Technical

- Frederic Seaman, Jerry Caron – production assistant
- Ed Sprigg – engineer
- Christopher Whorf – artwork

== Charts ==
Chart performance for Season of Glass
| Chart (1981) | Peak position |
|---|---|
| Australian Albums Chart | 62 |
| Norwegian Albums Chart | 31 |
| Swedish Albums Chart | 35 |
| UK Albums Chart | 47 |
| US Billboard 200 | 49 |

== Release history ==
Release history and formats for Season of Glass
| Country | Date | Format | Label | Catalog | Ref. |
|---|---|---|---|---|---|
| United Kingdom | 3 June 1981 | LP | Geffen Records | K 99164 | |
| United Kingdom | 3 June 1981 | LP + "Walking on Thin Ice" 7" | Geffen Records | K 99164 / K 79202 | |
| Germany | 8 June 1981 | LP | Geffen Records | GEF 99 164 | |
| Germany | 8 June 1981 | Cassette | Geffen Records | GEF 99 164 | |
| United States | 12 June 1981 | LP | Geffen Records | GHS-2004 | |
| United States | 12 June 1981 | Cassette | Geffen Records | GEF M5 2004 | |
| Japan | 1981 | LP | Geffen Records | P-11045J | |
| Australia | 1981 | LP | Geffen Records | GEF M5 2004 | |
| United States | 10 June 1997 | CD | Rykodisc | RCD 10421 | |
| Japan | 27 August 1997 | CD | Rykodisc | VACK-5377 | |
| United Kingdom | 8 September 1997 | CD | Rykodisc | RCD 10421 | |
| Worldwide | 17 July 2026 | Streaming | Secretly Canadian | | |
| Japan | 17 July 2026 | CD; LP | Sony Music Japan International | SICX-214; SIJP-239 | |
| United Kingdom | 31 July 2026 | CD; LP | Secretly Canadian | SC286 | |
