= It's Alright (I See Rainbows) =

Studio album by Yoko Ono
- Released: 2 November 1982
- Studios: The Hit Factory, New York City
- Genres: Pop; new wave
- Length: 36:43
- Label: Polygram
- Producer: Yoko Ono

Yoko Ono chronology
| Season of Glass (1981) | It's Alright (I See Rainbows) (1982) | Milk and Honey (1984) |

Singles from It's Alright (I See Rainbows)
- 1. "My Man" Released: 1 November 1982 (US); 26 November 1982 (UK); 2. "Never Say Goodbye" Released: 25 January 1983 (US)

It's Alright (I See Rainbows) is the sixth studio album by Japanese musician Yoko Ono, and her second release after the murder of husband John Lennon. As a variation of a theme concerning its predecessor, the back cover features a transparent image of Lennon in a then-contemporary photo of Yoko and Sean, depicted in Central Park. Released in 1982, all songs were written, composed, arranged, produced, and sung by Ono. It charted at #98 in the US.

== Background ==
The album saw Yoko take her music in a more uplifting direction following 1981's Season of Glass, despite the "bulk" of the album's songs "deal[ing] with her unabated feelings of loss over Lennon."

Yoko reflected on the making of the album when writing liner notes for the 1992 boxset Onobox:

The songs from It’s Alright were an attempt to do new sounds. I used shotguns for the backbeat. I brought Sean’s toy raygun to the studio to use it as a rhythm track. I was expecting the usual sneer I had gotten from the musicians and engineers whenever I had tried to do anything that was out of the ordinary. Surprisingly, no one was upset this time. It was ’82 and it seemed as though I was finally in sync with the world.

[...]

In a way, the It's Alright time was much more difficult for me as a woman, as a person, than when I had made Season Of Glass. Life went on. I had to walk and talk normally, while I knew that somewhere inside me there was a clock that had stopped in ’80.

— Yoko Ono, "ONOBOX by Yoko Ono". 23 April 2009.

In 1997, the album was remastered by Ono and Rob Stevens for release on CD by Rykodisc. The 1997 release used newly remixed versions of all songs. Some of the original mixes had a CD release in 1992 on the Onobox set but the rest remain unreleased on CD to date.

The album was re-issued by Secretly Canadian on 18 September 2026 on CD, black vinyl LP, white vinyl LP and also digital download and streaming for the first time. CD and digital releases include two bonus tracks, "Forgive Me, My Love" (originally released on 1992's Onobox) and a previously unreleased live performance of "Dream Love" recorded in Budapest.

== Reception ==
Professional ratings
Review scores
| Source | Rating |
|---|---|
| AllMusic | 2/5 stars |
| Rolling Stone | 4/5 stars |

Billboard called it Ono's "most commercially accessible musical effort." Writing for Rolling Stone, Kurt Loder noted its "committed and convincing avant-gardism", which produced a "synthesizer-based pop that’s more adventurous than much of the music currently being ground out by Europersons half her age."

Record Business called It's Alright "an engagingly intriguing album", and noted Yoko's "very personal message of lost love and coming to terms with a new existence" which makes for "a strong emotional statement". Also noted was the "imaginative production" that manages to "[weld] together the parts and [give] the album an overall dimension that is never less than impressive".

== Track listing ==
All songs written by Yoko Ono.

Side one
| No. | Title | Length |
|---|---|---|
| 1. | "My Man" | 3:56 |
| 2. | "Never Say Goodbye" | 4:25 |
| 3. | "Spec of Dust" | 3:31 |
| 4. | "Loneliness" | 3:47 |
| 5. | "Tomorrow May Never Come" | 2:26 |

Side two
| No. | Title | Length |
|---|---|---|
| 6. | "It's Alright" | 4:23 |
| 7. | "Wake Up" | 3:47 |
| 8. | "Let the Tears Dry" | 2:24 |
| 9. | "Dream Love" | 4:53 |
| 10. | "I See Rainbows" | 3:15 |

1997 CD reissue bonus tracks
| No. | Title | Length |
|---|---|---|
| 11. | "Beautiful Boys" (demo) | 2:00 |
| 12. | "You're the One" (alternate take) | 4:50 |

2026 CD and digital reissue bonus tracks
| No. | Title | Length |
|---|---|---|
| 11. | "Forgive Me, My Love" | 3:14 |
| 12. | "Dream Love" (Live in Budapest) | 5:56 |

== Personnel ==
- Yoko Ono – vocals
- Paul Griffin – keyboards, synthesizer, piano
- Pete Cannarozzi – synthesizer
- Gordon Grody, Kurt Yahjihan, Carlos Alomar – background vocals
- Elliott Randall, Steve Love, Hugh McCracken, John Lennon, John Tropea – guitar
- Michael Holmes, Paul Shaffer – keyboards
- Neil Jason, Tony Levin, Wayne Pedziwiatr – bass guitar
- Yogi Horton, Allan Schwartzberg – drums
- Rubens Bassini, David A. Freedman, Sammy Figueroa, Roger Squitero – percussion
- Badal Roy – tabla
- Howard Johnson – baritone saxophone, tuba

Technical

- Brian McGee, John Davenport, Jon Smith – engineer
- Bob Gruen – photography

== Charts ==
| Chart (1982–83) | Peak position | Total weeks |
|---|---|---|
| U.S. Billboard 200 | 98 | 13 |

== Release history ==
| Country | Date | Format | Label | Catalog | Ref. |
|---|---|---|---|---|---|
| United States | 2 November 1982 | LP; Cassette | Polydor | PD1-6364; CT-1-6364 | |
| United Kingdom | 16 December 1982 | LP; Cassette | Polydor | POLD 5073; POLDC 5073 | |
| Germany | 1982 | LP | Polydor | 2391559 | |
| Australia | 1982 | LP | Polydor | 2391559 | |
| Japan | January 1983 | LP | Polydor | 28MM 0241 | |
| United States | 1 July 1997 | CD | Rykodisc | RCD 10422 | |
| Japan | 27 August 1997 | CD | Rykodisc | VACK-5378 | |
| United Kingdom | 8 September 1997 | CD | Rykodisc | RCD 10422 | |
| Worldwide | 18 September 2026 | Streaming | Chimera Music/Secretly Canadian | | |
| Japan | 23 September 2026 | CD | Chimera Music/Secretly Canadian | SICX-225 | |
