= Rising (Yoko Ono album) =

Studio album by Yoko Ono/IMA
- Released: 7 November 1995
- Recorded: Quad Recording, New York City
- Genres: Alternative rock, art rock
- Length: 59:13
- Label: Capitol
- Producers: Yoko Ono, Rob Stevens

Yoko Ono chronology
New York Rock (1994)	Rising (1995)	A Story (1997)

Rising is the eighth studio album by Japanese artist and musician Yoko Ono. Released on 7 November by Capitol Records, it features the backing band IMA (Japanese for "Now"), which included Ono's son Sean Ono Lennon, Timo Ellis, and Sam Koppelman. It was her first album of new material since 1985's Starpeace. The album has sold 11,000 copies in the U.S. to date.

== Reception ==
Professional ratings
Review scores
Source	Rating
AllMusic	3/5 stars
Artforum International	Positive
Robert Christgau	A−
The Guardian	Positive
Rolling Stone	4/5 stars

The British newspaper The Guardian named the album "Pop CD of the week" in January 1996. In their review, the album was described as an "unexpected minor triumph". The reviewer, Dan Glaister, further noted that "underlying all the hurt and anger" was also "an overwhelming honesty and humanity" and that the album "succeeds in imparting enormous positivity". Glaister singled out the track "Kurushi" as a "haunting, gentle call to a loved one" and described "Goodbye, My Love" as a "mournful, jolly little ballad a la McCartney".

Bruce Hainley of art magazine Artforum International wrote that the album "affirms her amazing talents as a musician" and described it as "an uncompromising blend of Conceptual art and rock 'n' roll" with Yoko using a "wide range of vocals [...] from the aggressive to the sultry to fusion". He also felt that it was "hard to imagine a better place to start for those unfamiliar with her work". Hainley also praised the remix album Rising Mixes, which "[showed] the continuing reach of Ono's influence on rock since the '70s". He described the bonus song "Franklin Summer" as "hypnotic".

In a 2023 article for The Guardian, Alexis Petridis ranked "Talking to the Universe" as Yoko Ono's sixteenth best song in her catalog.

== Track listing ==
All songs written by Yoko Ono.

1. "Warzone" – 1:55
2. "Wouldnit" – 3:02
3. "Ask the Dragon" – 4:12
4. "New York Woman" – 2:07
5. "Talking to the Universe" – 3:31
6. "Turned the Corner" – 2:58
7. "I'm Dying" – 6:18
8. "Where Do We Go from Here?" – 3:02
9. "Kurushi" – 7:59
10. "Will I" – 2:27
11. "Rising" – 14:28
12. "Goodbye My Love" – 2:22
13. "Revelations" – 5:35
14. "Ask the Dragon" (Ween Remix) – 4:49 (Japanese edition bonus track)
15. "Talking to the Universe" (Cibo Matto Remix) – 4:21 (Japanese edition bonus track)

== Rising Mixes (released 3 June 1996) ==
1. "Talking to the Universe" (Cibo Matto Remix) (4.21)
2. "The Source" (ABA All Stars) (4.58)
3. "Ask the Dragon" (Ween Remix) (4.49)
4. "Where Do We Go from Here?" (Tricky Remix) (5.07)
5. "Rising" (Thurston Moore Remix) (8.48)
6. "Franklin Summer" (Yoko Ono/IMA)* (30.02)

The ABA All Stars remix is credited to Miho Hatori, Yuka Honda and Sean Lennon (the members of Cibo Matto), as well as Adam Yauch of the Beastie Boys. Keiji Haino, Masonna, Monde Bruits, Incapacitants, C.C.C.C., Hanatarash, MSBR, and The Gerogerigegege are also credited as performers in Thurston Moore's remix of "Rising".

A vinyl promo version was released with the track listing:-

1. "Ask the Dragon" (Ween Remix) (4.49)
2. "Talking to the Universe" (Cibo Matto Remix) (4.23)
3. "The Source" (ABA All Stars) (4.58)
4. "Where Do We Go from Here?" (Tricky Remix) (5.04)
5. "Rising" (Thurston Moore Remix) (8.48)
6. "Kurushi (Perry Farrell Mix)" (7.26)

== Personnel ==
- Yoko Ono – vocals
- Sean Ono Lennon – guitars, bass guitar, backing vocals, keyboards
- Timo Ellis – guitars, bass guitar, drums
- Sam Koppelman – bass, drums, percussions

== Production ==
- Yoko Ono, Rob Stevens – producers
- Alfred Brand, Chris Habeck, Mike Anzelowitz, Wes Naprstek – engineers
- David Ayers – A&R
- George Marino – mastering
- Rob Stevens, Yoko Ono – mixing
- Recorded at Broome Street – Timo Ellis (track : 4)
- Recorded at Quad Recording – Rob Stevens (tracks: 1–3,5–13)

== Release history ==
=== Rising ===
Country	Date	Format	Label	Cat. No.	Ref.
United States	1995	CD	Capitol Records	CDP 724383581726	
United States	1995	Cassette	Capitol Records	C4 724383581740	
Japan	13 December 1995	CD	Capitol Records	TOCP-8737	
United Kingdom	22 January 1996	CD	Capitol Records	CDP 8358172	

=== Rising Mixes ===
Country	Date	Format	Label	Cat. No.	Ref.
United States	1996	CD	Capitol Records	CDP 724383726806	
United States	1996	LP (Promo)	Capitol Records	SPRO-11219/11222	
United States	1996	Cassette (Promo)	Capitol Records	CDP 37268	
United Kingdom	3 June 1996	CD	Capitol Records	CDP 8372680	
