= Death of Samantha (song) =

Single by Yoko Ono

from the album Approximately Infinite Universe
- B-side: "Yang Yang"
- Released: 26 February 1973 (US); 4 May 1973 (UK)
- Genre: Rock
- Length: 3:40 (single edit); 6:22 (album version)
- Label: Apple
- Songwriter(s): Yoko Ono
- Producer(s): Yoko Ono; John Lennon

Yoko Ono singles chronology
"Now or Never" (1972)	"Death of Samantha" (1973)	"Josejoi Banzai" (1973)

"Death of Samantha" is a song written by Yoko Ono and first released on her 1973 album Approximately Infinite Universe. It was also released as a single, backed by "Yang Yang". It has also been covered by a number of artists, including Boy George, Hermine Demoriane and Porcupine Tree.

== Description ==
"Death of Samantha" is sung by Ono, with her husband John Lennon playing rhythm guitar and Elephant's Memory providing additional musical backing. Author Gillian Gaar has called the song a "moving portrayal" of a woman who has "repressed all feelings for the sake of outward appearance". Steven Mirkin of the Orange County Register describes the song as "slow twisty blues". Jon Pareles of The New York Times calls the song "elegiac". Ono biographer Jerry Hopkins calls it "depressing". Author Bruce Pollock claims that in the song, Ono "sounds eerily like Kate Bush".

Ono's son Sean Lennon claims that the song was inspired by an incident that occurred on election night in 1972. That night, Richard Nixon, whose administration had Lennon under surveillance and wanted Lennon deported, was re-elected as President of the United States. Lennon got drunk at a party and fondled another woman's breasts. Sean has stated that the song "was all about dad having sex with some girl at a party where my mom was". Ono has said that the song flashed to her in the studio, remembering "something terribly upsetting" that had happened to her, and was feeling like she was "really sad".

Ono has stated that when she wrote the song she "sort of saw this graveyard", explaining that it was not exactly a graveyard because there weren't many gravestones, but rather a gray day with "gray people standing around like somebody has died".

After John Lennon's death, many fans found the lyrics of "Death of Samantha" descriptive of the vigil for Lennon. Ono has said that at the time "many fans sent me the 'Death of Samantha' lyrics saying that it was uncanny that the lyrics seemed to be describing the vigil. They said, 'You were talking about now.' It was very sad but in a way it was kind of spot-on."

== Reception ==
Record World said that "This cut is about a 'cool chick' and has a good shot to be Yoko's first solo smash. Fine playing by Elephant's Memory band."

Ultimate Classic Rock critic Michael Gallucci rated it as Ono's 3rd best song, describing it as "a bluesy dirge that's part-feminist manifesto, part-lover's lament, and one of her best songs."

In addition to its appearance on Approximately Infinite Universe, "Death of Samantha" has appeared on a number of Ono's compilation albums, including Onobox and Walking on Thin Ice.

== Other versions ==
Porcupine Tree covered "Death of Samantha" on the 2007 collaboration album Yes, I'm a Witch, performing with Ono's vocals. James Hunter of SPIN Magazine describes their version as "gothlike." Robert Sandall of The Daily Telegraph remarks on the contrast between Ono's "gravely tremulous vocal" and the acoustic guitar backing, which he describes as "a stark approach which lends her the air of a Leonard Cohen impersonator". Amy Longsdorf of The Spokesman-Review calls it one of the best songs on Yes, I'm a Witch, claiming it has a "silvery spaciousness" to it, describing the song as "aching".

Hermine Demoriane covered the song on her 1984 album Lonely at the Top. AllMusic critic Ned Raggett calls this version "an inspired nod to an equally unique artist".

A cover by Boy George has been released on his 2013 album This Is What I Do. A dub version, featuring Sinéad O'Connor, can be found on the online-only release of "This Is What I Dub".

== Other influences ==
The punk rock band Death of Samantha took its name from this song.

The song also features on the soundtrack to the Australian 2016 film Boys in the Trees.
