= Twinkle (singer) =

English singer-songwriter (1948–2015)

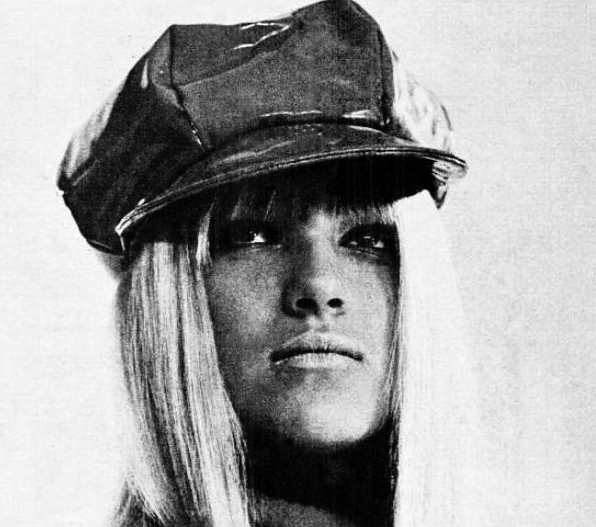
- Twinkle in 1964

Background information
- Also known as: Twinkle Ripley
- Born: Lynn Annette Ripley; 15 July 1948; Surbiton, Surrey, England
- Died: 21 May 2015 (aged 66) Isle of Wight, England
- Genres: Pop
- Occupation: Singer-songwriter
- Instrument: Vocals
- Years active: 1963–1980s
- Label: Decca

Lynn Annette Ripley (15 July 1948 – 21 May 2015), known professionally as Twinkle, was an English singer-songwriter. She had chart success in the 1960s with her songs "Terry" and "Golden Lights".

== Early life ==
Born in Surbiton, Surrey, into a well-to-do family, Ripley was known to her family as Twinkle. She attended Queen's Gate School with Camilla Shand, later Queen Consort of the United Kingdom, and was the aunt of actress Fay Ripley.

== Career ==
Twinkle owed her rapid entry into the recording studio at the age of 16 to her then-boyfriend Dec Cluskey, of the popular vocal group The Bachelors, who was introduced to her by her sister, music journalist Dawn James, and who passed on to his manager a demo that Twinkle's father played to him. Her song Terry was a teenage tragedy song about the death of a boyfriend in a motorcycle crash. Big Jim Sullivan, Jimmy Page and Bobby Graham were among the session musicians who played on the recording, which conjured up a dark mood with its doleful backing vocals, spooky organ, 12-string guitar and slow, emphatic rhythm arranged by Phil Coulter. The theme was of a common type for the era: it bore some similarities to the Shangri-Las' slightly earlier "Leader of the Pack" (1964), but the record caused a furore, accusations of bad taste leading to a ban from the BBC.

The follow-up, Golden Lights, was also written by Twinkle, with a B-side again by producer Tommy Scott. By then Cluskey was her ex-boyfriend: Twinkle dated Peter Noone in 1965. The lyric expresses disillusionment with the pop business: her EP track "A Lonely Singing Doll", the English-language version of France Gall's 1965 winning Eurovision Song Contest song for Luxembourg, "Poupée de cire, poupée de son", originally written by Serge Gainsbourg, returned to a theme similar to "Golden Lights". "Johnny" continued to explore dangerous territory, this time that of a childhood friend who becomes a criminal, but it seems the pressure to produce "another Terry" led her producers to pass over her own material, for "Tommy", a song written for Reparata and the Delrons and "The End of the World" a tune composed for Skeeter Davis. Twinkle made few live appearances but performed Terry at the annual New Musical Express hit concerts. After recording six singles for Decca Records she "retired" at the age of eighteen in 1966.

In 1969 she recorded a self-written single, the Tamla Motown-styled "Micky", backed by "Darby and Joan", both produced by Mike d'Abo for the Instant label. The single vanished, unpublicised. In the ensuing years, unsigned and working in music for advertising, she recorded a suite of songs inspired by her relationship with "Micky", the actor/model Michael Hannah, who was killed in an air-crash in 1974. These remained unreleased until they were included on CD compilations. Her later recordings appeared under the name Twinkle Ripley. She recorded a 1975 single, "Smoochie" with her father, Sydney Ripley as "Bill & Coo".

In the 1980s "Golden Lights" was covered by The Smiths and appeared on their compilation albums The World Won't Listen and Louder Than Bombs while in 1983 Cindy & The Saffrons covered "Terry". "Terry" was also covered by Mandy Smith in 1987, but her highly publicised version was pulled from release after negative feedback. It was later issued on a special edition of her album, Mandy.

Photographic publicity portraits of Twinkle taken in the mid-1960s are exhibited in the National Portrait Gallery.

== Personal life ==
In 1972, she married actor-model Graham Rogers, who starred in Milk Tray chocolate adverts. They had two children, Michael and Amber.

== Death ==
On 21 May 2015, Twinkle died at 66 on the Isle of Wight, after a five-year battle with cancer.

== Discography ==
=== Singles ===
for Decca Records

- "Terry" (Twinkle) b/w "The Boy of My Dreams" (Tommy Scott) (1964) UK No. 4
- "Golden Lights" (Twinkle) b/w "Ain't Nobody Home but Me" (Tommy Scott) (1965) UK No. 21
- "Tommy" (Chip Taylor, Ted Daryll) b/w "So Sad" (Tommy Scott) (1965)
- "Poor Old Johnny" (Twinkle) b/w "I Need Your Hand in Mine" (Tommy Scott) (1965)
- "The End of the World" (Arthur Kent and Sylvia Dee) b/w "Take Me to the Dance" (Tommy Scott) (1965)
- "What Am I Doing Here with You?" (P. F. Sloan, Steve Barri) b/w "Now I Have You" (Tommy Scott) (1966)

for Instant Records

- "Micky" (Twinkle) b/w "Darby and Joan" (Twinkle) (1969)

for Bradleys Records, as Twinkle Ripley

- "Days" (Twinkle Ripley) b/w "Caroline" (Twinkle Ripley) (1974)

for Bradleys Records, as duo Bill & Coo

- "Smoochie" (Jim Jim) b/w "I Always Love You" (Jim Jim) (1975)

for EMI Records, as Twinkle

- "I'm a Believer" (Neil Diamond) b/w "For Sale" (Twinkle Ripley and Simon Darlow) (1982)

=== EP ===
- Lonely Singing Doll (Decca, DFE 8621, May 1965) "A Lonely Singing Doll" (Serge Gainsbourg, Tommy Scott, Bill Martin), "Unhappy Boy" (Twinkle), "Ain't Nobody Home But Me" (Tommy Scott) and "Golden Lights" (Twinkle)

=== Compilations ===
- Golden Lights (1993)
- Golden Lights: Special Edition (2001)
- Michael Hannah, The Lost Years (2003)
- Girl in a Million: The Complete Recordings (2019)

== See also ==
- List of performers on Top of the Pops
- Beat-Club
