= Approximately Infinite Universe =

Studio album by Yoko Ono
- Released: 8 January 1973
- Recorded: Mid-October–late November 1972
- Studios: The Record Plant and Butterfly, New York City
- Length: 87:17
- Label: Apple
- Producers: John Lennon, Yoko Ono

Yoko Ono chronology
Some Time in New York City (1972)	Approximately Infinite Universe (1973)	Feeling the Space (1973)

Singles from Approximately Infinite Universe
- 1. "Now or Never" / "Move on Fast" Released: 13 November 1972 (US); 2. "Death of Samantha" / "Yang Yang" Released: 26 February 1973 (US); 4 May 1973 (UK)

Professional ratings
Review scores
Source	Rating
AllMusic	4/5 stars
Pitchfork	8.2/10
Record Collector	4/5 stars
Rolling Stone	(not rated)

Approximately Infinite Universe is the third studio album by Japanese musician Yoko Ono, released in early 1973 on Apple Records. A double album, it represents a departure from the experimental avant garde rock of her first two albums towards a more conventional pop/rock sound, while also dabbling in feminist rock. It peaked at number 193 in the United States.

== Background ==
The album was recorded at The Record Plant in New York City, except for the basic tracks for "Catman" and "Winter Song", which were taped at Butterfly Studios. Ono produced the album with John Lennon, whose participation marked a rare music-related activity for him after the failure of the couple's politically themed 1972 double album Some Time in New York City. Lennon also sang the final verse of the song, "I Want My Love to Rest Tonight". As on the latter album, Ono used the New York band Elephant's Memory as her backing musicians. Mick Jagger dropped into the studio for some of the sessions. He recalled playing guitar very loudly with Lennon. Jagger also said that Ono "was really trying to sing properly. She's not screaming, she's really trying to sing."

The inside gatefold sleeve contained Ono's essay "The Feminization of Society". An abridged version of this essay was previously published in The New York Times in February 1972. The full essay was published in Sundance Magazine in May 1972.

== Track listing ==
All songs written by Yoko Ono.

=== Original release ===
Side one

1. "Yang Yang" – 3:52
2. "Death of Samantha" – 6:23
3. "I Want My Love to Rest Tonight" – 5:11
4. "What Did I Do!" – 4:11
5. "Have You Seen a Horizon Lately?" – 1:55

Side two

6. "Approximately Infinite Universe" – 3:19
7. "Peter the Dealer" – 4:43
8. "Song for John" – 2:02
9. "Catman (The Rosies Are Coming)" – 5:29
10. "What a Bastard the World Is" – 4:33
11. "Waiting for the Sunrise" – 2:32

Side three

1. "I Felt Like Smashing My Face in a Clear Glass Window" – 4:09
2. "Winter Song" – 3:37
3. "Kite Song" – 3:19
4. "What a Mess" – 2:41
5. "Shiranakatta (I Didn't Know)" – 3:13
6. "Air Talk" – 3:21

Side four

7. "I Have a Woman Inside My Soul" – 5:31
8. "Move on Fast" – 3:40
9. "Now or Never" – 4:57
10. "Is Winter Here to Stay?" – 4:27
11. "Looking Over from My Hotel Window" – 3:30

=== CD reissue ===
Tracks 1–22 per sides one to four of the original album, with the following bonus tracks on disc two:

12. "Dogtown" (acoustic demo) – 2:51
13. "She Gets Down on Her Knees" (acoustic demo) – 2:45
- "She Gets Down on Her Knees" (acoustic demo) is not present on the 2017 reissue

== Personnel ==
- Yoko Ono – vocals, piano on "Looking Over from My Hotel Window" and "She Gets Down on Her Knees", arrangements
- Joel Nohnn (pseudonym of John Lennon) – guitar, backing vocals
- Stan Bronstein – saxophone, flute, clarinet
- Rick Frank – drums, percussion
- Daria Price – castanets
- Gary Van Scyoc – bass guitar, trumpet
- Adam Ippolito – piano, Hammond organ, harmonium, trumpet
- Wayne "Tex" Gabriel – guitar
- Mick Jagger – guitar on "Is Winter Here to Stay?"

Production credits

- Produced by Yoko Ono and John Lennon
- Arrangement – Yoko Ono
- String orchestration – Ron Frangipane
- Chief engineer – Jack Douglas
- Assistant engineer – Danny Turbeville
- Butterfly Studio engineer – Kurt Munkacsi
- Re-release produced by Yoko Ono and Rob Stevens (1997)
- Remastered by George Marino and Rob Stevens, Sterling Sound, New York City (1997)
- Bettina Rossner, John Lennon, Yoko Ono – artwork
- Bob Gruen, Iain MacMillan – photography

== In popular culture ==
The post-punk rock band Death of Samantha, founded in 1983, named themselves after the song of that name on this album.

== Charts ==
Chart (1973)	Peak position	Total weeks
U.S. Billboard 200	193	4

== Release history ==
Country	Date	Format	Label	Catalog	Ref.
United States	8 January 1973	2xLP	Apple Records	SVBB 3399	
United States	8 January 1973	2x8-Track	Apple Records	8VV 3399	
United Kingdom	16 February 1973	2xLP	Apple Records	SAPDO 1001	
Japan	1973	2xLP	Apple Records	EAP-93087B	
France	1973	2xLP	Apple Records	2C162-94221/2	
United States	10 June 1997	2xCD	Rykodisc	RCD 10417/18	
Japan	23 July 1997	2xCD	Rykodisc	VACK-5373/4	
United Kingdom	18 August 1997	2xCD	Rykodisc	RCD 10417/18	
Japan	24 January 2007	2xCD	Rykodisc, Apple Records	VACK-1310	
United States & Europe	14 July 2017	2xLP	Secretly Canadian, Chimera Music	SC283/CHIM22	
United States & Europe	14 July 2017	2xLP (White)	Secretly Canadian, Chimera Music	SC283/CHIM22	
United States & Europe	14 July 2017	2xCD	Secretly Canadian, Chimera Music	SC283/CHIM22	
Japan	2 August 2017	2xCD	Sony Records International	SICX-86	
Japan	9 August 2017	2xLP (White)	Sony Records International	SIJP-51	
