= Walking on Thin Ice =

Single by Yoko Ono
- B-side: "It Happened" (7' version) "It Happened"/"Hard Times Are Over" (12" version)
- Released: February 6, 1981
- Recorded: December 4–8, 1980
- Studio: The Hit Factory, New York City
- Genre: Dance; post-disco; new wave; funk rock
- Length: 6:00
- Label: Geffen
- Songwriter: Yoko Ono
- Producers: John Lennon, Yoko Ono, Jack Douglas

Yoko Ono singles chronology
"Beautiful Boys" (1980)	"Walking on Thin Ice" (1981)	"No, No, No" (1981)
"Yang Yang" (2002)	"Walking on Thin Ice" (2003)	"Will I" / "Fly" (2003)
"Hold Me" (2013)	"Walking on Thin Ice" (2013)	"Angel" (2014)

Alternative cover
- The cover of ONO's "Walking on Thin Ice" 2003 remix single.

"Walking on Thin Ice" is a song by Yoko Ono, released in 1981. She and John Lennon completed the recording of the song on December 8, 1980, hours before Lennon was murdered by Mark David Chapman. Lennon was holding the unmastered tape of the song when he was shot. The song was both a critical and commercial success for Ono.

== Background ==
Lennon's lead guitar work on the track, which he recorded on December 4, 1980, was his final creative act. According to producer Jack Douglas, Lennon used his famous Beatles-era 1958 Rickenbacker 325 Capri to record all the guitar parts. Douglas worked the Bigsby tremolo bar for Lennon during the solo. It was rumored he used his new red Fender Stratocaster.

The lyrics talk of the unpredictability of life and death—of "throwing the dice in the air"—and reach the conclusion, "when our hearts return to ashes, it will be just a story....". On the version included on 1992's Onobox, a new intro was added, where John Lennon can be heard remarking "I think you just cut your first number one, Yoko."

The B-side, "It Happened", was a slower, mellow track about acceptance from Ono's vaults that was originally recorded for A Story and had already seen limited release in Japan as the B-side to "Yume O Moto", but was remixed for inclusion on the single. Much like the A-side, the lyrics have a retrospectively haunting quality given Lennon's murder: "It happened at a time of my life/When I least expected... And I know there's no return, no way". In the essay on the back of the single, Ono talks about how Lennon picked out this track from her old tapes and marked it as a hit. She said "No way!" to which he responded "I'll make it a hit". He was murdered hours later.

== Release and reception ==
At the end of January 1981, "Walking on Thin Ice" was released as a single and became Ono's first chart success, peaking at number 58 in the US and gaining major club/underground airplay. The single was released in February 1981 in the UK and reached number 35 on the chart. The critical reception was favorable: NME rated it in the best tracks of year 1981 at number 10.

Writing for Record Business magazine, Barry Lazell noted the appearance of "Walking on Thin Ice" on the magazine's Disco chart "might cause a few raised eyebrows" but that it was nonetheless "getting strong reaction from DJ buyers despite the lack of a 12-inch pressing", though the cassette single "did not seem to be making notable headway through specialised outlets".

Ultimate Classic Rock critic Michael Gallucci rated it as Ono's best song, saying "it's a great New Wave song from the era and a testament to Ono's growing influence on other outre artists who followed." Record World said that "Yoko's existential lyrics are delivered over a driving rhythm – led by Tony Levin's spunky bass – that spews Lennon's molten guitar leads."

The song is on the experimental compilation album called Disco Not Disco (2000). In 2003, riding on the success of several Ono club remixes including "Open Your Box" and "Kiss Kiss Kiss", "Walking on Thin Ice" was released as a maxi-single with remixes by dance artists including the Pet Shop Boys, Danny Tenaglia and Felix Da Housecat. It spent many weeks on the US dance chart before reaching number one, beating out Madonna and Justin Timberlake. In the UK, it reached number 35 on the chart, exactly the same position as the original reached in 1981.

== Music videos ==
Yoko Ono herself directed a music video for "Walking on Thin Ice", released in February 1981, featuring footage of her in New York City's Times Square and Central Park, interspersed with archival video of her and John Lennon. In 2003, Mike Mills and Arya Senboutaraj (one half of the directing duo Rainbows & Vampires) directed an animated video featuring the "Pet Shop Boys Electro Mix Edit" of the song.

== Track listings ==
=== 1981 ===
Promo 7" single

- A. "Walking on Thin Ice" (edit) – 3:23
- B. "Walking on Thin Ice" (long version) – 5:58

7" / 12" single

- A. "Walking on Thin Ice" – 5:59
- B. "It Happened" (Remix) – 5:08

Promo 12" / Cassingle

- A. "Walking on Thin Ice" – 5:59
- B1. "It Happened" (Remix) – 5:08
- B2. "Hard Times Are Over" – 3:26

=== 2003 ===
CD Maxi

1. Pet Shop Boys Radio Mix – 4:09
2. Danny Tenaglia Walked Across the Lake Mix – 12:40
3. Pet Shop Boys Electro Mix – 6:37
4. Felix da Housecat's Tribute Mix – 5:29
5. Pet Shop Boys Extended Dance Mix – 7:58
6. Rui da Silva's Kismet Mix – 10:42
7. Peter Rauhofer Electro Mix – 6:08
8. Orange Factory Radio Mix – 3:54
9. FKEK Vocal Mix – 9:55
10. Peter Rauhofer Chill Mix – 4:58

2×12" single

1. Danny Tenaglia Walked Across the Lake Mix – 12:40
2. Peter Rauhofer Future Mix – 10:07
3. Pet Shop Boys Electro Mix – 6:37
4. Pet Shop Boys Extended Dance Mix – 7:58
5. Rui da Silva's Kismet Mix – 10:42
6. FKEK Hard As Ice Dub – 8:35
7. Orange Factory "Larry" Dub – 6:20
8. Orange Factory Yoko-pella – 0:34

UK 12" single

1. Danny Tenaglia Walked Across the Lake Mix – 12:40
2. Pet Shop Boys Electro Mix – 6:37

US 12" single

1. Danny Tenaglia Dub – 9:07
2. Felix da Housecat's Tribute Mix – 5:29
3. FKEK Vocal Mix – 9:55

UK CD1

1. Pet Shop Boys Electro Mix Edit – 3:35
2. Pet Shop Boys 7" Mix – 4:06
3. Pet Shop Boys 12" Mix – 7:56

UK CD2

1. Danny Tenaglia Walked Across the Lake Mix
2. Felix Da Housecat's Tribute Mix Edit
3. FKEK Vocal Mix Edit

UK CD promo

1. Pet Shop Boys Electro Mix Edit
2. Felix Da Housecat Tribute Mix Edit

iTunes single

1. Pet Shop Boys Radio Mix – 4:09
2. Danny Tenaglia Walked Across the Lake Mix – 12:40
3. Pet Shop Boys Electro Mix – 6:37
4. Felix da Housecat's Tribute Mix – 5:29
5. Pet Shop Boys Extended Dance Mix – 7:58
6. Rui da Silva's Kismet Mix – 10:42
7. Peter Rauhofer Electro Mix – 6:08
8. Orange Factory Radio Mix – 3:54
9. FKEK Vocal Mix – 9:55
10. Peter Rauhofer Chill Mix – 4:58
11. Peter Rauhofer Future Mix – 10:07
12. FKEK Hard as Ice Dub – 8:35
13. Orange Factory "Larry" Dub – 6:20
14. Orange Factory Yoko-pella – 0:34
15. Danny Tenaglia Dub – 9:07

=== 2007 ===
1. "Walking on Thin Ice" (with Jason Pierce of Spiritualized) – 5:07
2. "Toyboat" (with Antony of Antony and the Johnsons and Hahn Rowe) – 4:24

=== 2013 ===
Pt. 1

1. Emjae Vocal Mix – 5:04
2. Emjae Dub – 5:31
3. Dave Aude Radio Mix – 3:48
4. Dave Aude House Mix – 6:35
5. Dave Aude House Dub – 6:12
6. Dave Aude House Instrumental – 6:35
7. Ralphi Rosario Radio Edit – 3:50
8. Ralphi Rosario Club Mix – 7:52
9. Ralphi Rosario Dub – 7:23

Pt. 2

1. Danny Tenaglia's Grand Ballroom Mix – 12:34
2. Danny Tenaglia's Maestro Version – 2:47
3. Danny Tenaglia's Give Ice a Chance Mix – 9:50
4. R3hab Mix – 4:06
5. R3hab Dub – 4:06
6. R3hab Instrumental – 4:06

Pt. 3

1. Superchumbo Mix – 8:13
2. Superchumbo Dub – 8:11
3. Tedd Patterson Club Mix – 6:58
4. Tedd Patterson Dub Mix – 6:58
5. Tedd Patterson Instrumental – 6:58
6. Morel Hot Sauce Mix – 5:35
7. Morel Hot Sauce Dub – 5:38
8. Danny Tenaglia & Sebastian Dub – 7:45

Pt. 4

1. Dave Aude Electro Disco Club Mix – 6:32
2. Dave Aude Electro Disco Instrumental – 6:32
3. Dave Aude Electro Disco Dub – 5:47
4. Dave Aude Electro Disco Radio Edit – 4:16
5. Peter Rauhofer Future Mix Twisted Edit – 5:41
6. 'Walking For Me' Sizequeen Mashup [feat. Sizequeen] – 5:51

SoundCloud exclusive

- Dave Aude House Mixshow – 5:23

== Personnel ==
Personnel for the original 1981 release:

- Yoko Ono – vocals
- John Lennon – lead guitar, keyboards
- Hugh McCracken – rhythm guitar
- Earl Slick – rhythm guitar
- Tony Levin – bass guitar
- Andy Newmark – drums
- Jack Douglas – percussion

Technical personnel:

- John Lennon – producer
- Yoko Ono – producer
- Jack Douglas – producer
- Lee DeCarlo – engineer
- Jon Smith – assistant engineer
- Julie Last – assistant engineer
- Sam Ginsberg – assistant engineer
- Steve Mark – assistant engineer

Recorded at The Hit Factory, New York City; mixed at Record Plant, New York City.

== Awards and nominations ==
Year	Awards	Work	Category	Result	Ref.
1982	Grammy Awards	"Walking on Thin Ice"	Best Rock Vocal Performance, Female	Nominated	

== Charts ==
=== Weekly charts ===
Chart (1981)	Peak position
Australia (Kent Music Report)	18
Canada (RPM)	22
Luxembourg (Radio Luxembourg)	15
New Zealand (RIANZ)	48
Sweden (Sverigetopplistan)	6
UK Singles (OCC)	35
UK Singles Top 100 (Record Business)	29
UK Disco Top 50 (Record Business)	25
US Billboard Hot 100	58
US Dance Club Songs (Billboard)	13
Chart (2003)	Peak position
UK Singles (OCC)	35
UK Dance Singles (OCC)	5
US Dance Club Songs (Billboard) Remix	1
Chart (2013)	Peak position
US Dance Club Songs (Billboard) Walking On Thin Ice 2013	1
US Hot Dance/Electronic Songs (Billboard) Walking On Thin Ice 2013	23

=== Year-end charts ===
Chart (2013)	Position
US Dance Club Songs (Billboard) Walking On Thin Ice 2013	19
US Hot Dance/Electronic Songs (Billboard) Walking On Thin Ice 2013	79

== Release history ==
Release dates and formats for "Walking On Thin Ice"
Region	Date	Format(s)	Label(s)	Cat. No.	Ref.
United Kingdom	February 20, 1981	7-inch	Geffen	K 79202	
United Kingdom	June 2, 2003	CD1; CD2; 12-inch	Mind Train	CDMINDS 002; CDMIND 002; 12MIND 002	

== Covers ==
- Elvis Costello and The Attractions (ft. the TKO Horns) recorded a version on the album Every Man Has a Woman (1984).
- We've Got a Fuzzbox and We're Gonna Use It (aka Fuzzbox) released it as a single in 1989, peaking at #76 on the UK charts.
- The Picketts also recorded a version, (1985) as did Tila Tequila on her EP Welcome to the Dark Side (2010).
- Siouxsie Sioux performed it live with original guitarist Earl Slick and tabla player Talvin Singh, at Ono's Meltdown Festival in London in 2013.

== See also ==
- List of number-one dance singles of 2003 (U.S.)
- List of number-one dance singles of 2013 (U.S.)
- List of post-disco artists and songs
