= The Rolling Stones Rock and Roll Circus (album) =

1996 album

Live album by the Rolling Stones
- Released: 14 October 1996
- Recorded: 11–12 December 1968
- Genres: Rock, blues rock, hard rock
- Length: 59:05
- Label: ABKCO
- Director: Michael Lindsay-Hogg
- Producers: Jimmy Miller, Jody Klein, Lenne Allik

The Rolling Stones chronology
Stripped (1995)	The Rolling Stones; Rock and Roll Circus (1996)	Bridges to Babylon (1997)

The Rolling Stones Rock and Roll Circus is the fifth release of the Rolling Stones music by former manager Allen Klein's ABKCO Records (who gained control of the band's Decca/London material in 1970) after the band's departure from Decca and Klein. Released in 1996, The Rolling Stones Rock and Roll Circus is a live album that captures the taping of their ill-fated 1968 TV special, which was not broadcast until almost three decades later.

== Overview ==
Seeking an original way to promote the newly released Beggars Banquet, The Rolling Stones concocted the idea of recording a live extravaganza of music with a circus theme. They also invited guests to perform, among whom John Lennon (with Yoko Ono), the Who, Eric Clapton (fresh from the break-up of Cream), Taj Mahal, Jethro Tull (a short lived line-up featuring Tony Iommi), and Mick Jagger's then-current girlfriend, Marianne Faithfull, all took part. Specially for the occasion, Lennon, Clapton, Keith Richards (on bass) and Mitch Mitchell (of the Jimi Hendrix Experience) would form a one-time group entitled the Dirty Mac.

Recorded on 11 December into the early hours of the following day, the final results of most acts was positive, except for the Rolling Stones' performance (including the first ever appearance of "You Can't Always Get What You Want"), which they themselves felt was somewhat flat in places and lacked spark, especially when compared with both the Who's standout performance of "A Quick One While He's Away" and the Dirty Mac's rendition of the Beatles' "Yer Blues". Consequently, the Rolling Stones shelved the project with the intention of working on it further. However, with Brian Jones' death the following July, the project was left to gather dust.

The film was thought lost or destroyed, but parts were found in Ian Stewart's belongings following his death in 1985. A substantial portion of the film was still missing until it was rediscovered in 1993 in a Who vault in London. The film was completed in 1996 and premiered on 12 October 1996 at the Walter Reade Theater as part of the New York Film Festival.

The Rolling Stones Rock and Roll Circus album and a tie-in home video of the event was released in October 1996. The album reached No. 92 in the US at the Billboard 200. The Rolling Stones Rock and Roll Circus DVD edition was released in October 2004. Fifteen years later, a limited US remastered theatrical release of the film run during the first week of April 2019 in conjunction with what was—still then—the ongoing North American leg of the Rolling Stones' No Filter Tour (before it was later postponed).

Professional ratings
Review scores
Source	Rating
AllMusic	4/5 stars
Tom Hull	B+

== 2019 remastered reissue box set ==
On 30 April 2019, it was announced that the Rolling Stones would release on 7 June 2019 via ABKCO a new remastered Rock and Roll Circus (4-disc and 3LP vinyl) box set. The 2019 reissue would feature remastered audio and video from the original concert and some bonus material such as previously unreleased and never-before-heard recordings of the Beatles's "Revolution" and a "Warmup Jam" from impromptu John Lennon, Keith Richards, Mitch Mitchell, Eric Clapton supergroup, the Dirty Mac, as well as three additional Taj Mahal songs. A version of the Stones performing "Parachute Woman" would also be available only to stream. The film would also feature new commentary tracks from Richards, Mick Jagger, Michael Lindsay-Hogg, Yoko Ono, Marianne Faithfull and cinematographer Tony Richmond, plus an on-camera interview with Pete Townshend.

== Track listing ==
All songs by Mick Jagger and Keith Richards, except where noted.

Side one
No.	Title	Performing artist	Length
1.	"Mick Jagger's introduction of Rock and Roll Circus"		0:25
2.	"Entry of the Gladiators" (Julius Fučík)		0:55
3.	"Mick Jagger's introduction of Jethro Tull"		0:11
4.	"A Song for Jeffrey†" (Ian Anderson)	Jethro Tull	3:26
5.	"Keith Richards' introduction of The Who"		0:07
6.	"A Quick One, While He's Away" (Pete Townshend)	The Who	7:33
7.	"Over the Waves" (Juventino Rosas)		0:45

Side two
No.	Title	Performing artist	Length
8.	"Ain't That a Lot of Love" (Homer Banks, Willie Dean "Deanie" Parker)	Taj Mahal	3:48
9.	"Charlie Watts' introduction of Marianne Faithfull"		0:06
10.	"Something Better" (Gerry Goffin, Barry Mann)	Marianne Faithfull	2:32
11.	"Mick Jagger's and John Lennon's introduction of The Dirty Mac"		1:05
12.	"Yer Blues" (Lennon–McCartney)	The Dirty Mac	4:27
13.	"Whole Lotta Yoko" (Yoko Ono)	The Dirty Mac, Yoko Ono, and Ivry Gitlis	4:49

Side three
No.	Title	Performing artist	Length
14.	"John Lennon's introduction of The Rolling Stones/Jumpin' Jack Flash"	The Rolling Stones	3:35
15.	"Parachute Woman"	The Rolling Stones	2:59
16.	"No Expectations"	The Rolling Stones	4:13
17.	"You Can't Always Get What You Want"	The Rolling Stones	4:24

Side four
No.	Title	Performing artist	Length
18.	"Sympathy for the Devil"	The Rolling Stones	8:49
19.	"Salt of the Earth"	The Rolling Stones	4:57

"Salt of the Earth" features the original Beggars Banquet music track with new live vocals
† "Song for Jeffrey" ("A Song for Jeffrey") features the original This Was backing track with live vocals sung by Ian Anderson.

=== 2019 Bonus Tracks ===
Side five
No.	Title	Performing artist	Length
1.	"Checkin' Up on My Baby" (Sonny Boy Williamson)	Taj Mahal	5:52
2.	"Leaving Trunk" (Sleepy John Estes)	Taj Mahal	6:48
3.	"Corinna" (Taj Mahal, Jesse Ed Davis)	Taj Mahal	4:46

Side six
No.	Title	Performing artist	Length
1.	"Revolution" (Lennon-McCartney) (Rehearsal)	The Dirty Mac	2:48
2.	"Warmup Jam" (John Lennon, Keith Richards, Eric Clapton, Mitch Mitchell)	The Dirty Mac	4:18
3.	"Yer Blues" (Lennon-McCartney) (Take 2)	The Dirty Mac	4:31
4.	"Brian Jones' introduction of Julius Katchen"		0:20
5.	"Ritual Fire Dance" (Manuel de Falla)	Julius Katchen	4:04
6.	"Sonata in C 1st Movement" (Wolfgang Amadeus Mozart)	Julius Katchen	2:28

== Charts ==
Chart (1996)	Peak position
Australian Albums (ARIA)	46
Austrian Albums (Ö3 Austria)	41
Belgian Albums (Ultratop Flanders)	48
Belgian Albums (Ultratop Wallonia)	78
French Albums (SNEP)	55
German Albums (Offizielle Top 100)	17
Japanese Albums (Oricon)	52
Norwegian Albums (VG-lista)	17
Swedish Albums (Sverigetopplistan)	34
Swiss Albums (Schweizer Hitparade)	59
US Billboard 200	92
