= Live Peace in Toronto 1969 =

Live album by Plastic Ono Band
- Released: 12 December 1969
- Recorded: 13 September 1969
- Venues: Toronto Rock and Roll Revival, Varsity Stadium, Toronto, Canada
- Genres: Rock and roll; avant-garde
- Length: 39:32
- Label: Apple
- Producers: John Lennon, Yoko Ono

John Lennon and Yoko Ono chronology
Wedding Album (1969)	Live Peace in Toronto 1969 (1969)	John Lennon/Plastic Ono Band (1970) — Yoko Ono/Plastic Ono Band (1970)

Live Peace in Toronto 1969 is a live album by the Plastic Ono Band, released in December 1969 on Apple Records. Recorded at the Toronto Rock and Roll Revival festival, it was the first live album released by any member of the Beatles separately or together. John Lennon and his wife Yoko Ono received a phone call from the festival's promoters John Brower and Kenny Walker, and then assembled a band on very short notice for the festival, which was due to start the following day. The band included Eric Clapton, Klaus Voormann, and drummer Alan White. The group flew from London and had brief unamplified rehearsals on the plane before appearing on the stage to perform several songs; one of which, "Cold Turkey", was first performed live at the festival. After returning home, Lennon mixed the album in a day.

The album peaked at number 10 on the Billboard 200 and was certified a gold album by the RIAA, representing 500,000 copies in sales. The album did not chart in the UK. The original LP included a 13-month 1970 calendar. A video of several performances, not just the Plastic Ono Band's set, was released. Since its first release, the album has been reissued a number of times.

== Background ==
Toronto rock promoters John Brower and Kenny Walker organised a festival held at Varsity Stadium in Toronto on 13 September 1969, around the notion of a revival of rock and roll stars from the 1950s, booking Chuck Berry, Little Richard, Jerry Lee Lewis, Fats Domino, Bo Diddley, and Gene Vincent. They also booked more modern acts such as Alice Cooper, Chicago, and the Doors.

On 12 September, Brower contacted Lennon, who was still a member of the Beatles, to ask him to be the master of ceremonies for the festival. Instead, Lennon offered to perform at the show with a new group, the Plastic Ono Band. Brower readily agreed, but since Lennon did not actually have a new group, he quickly began making phone calls to potential members to accompany himself and Yoko Ono. He initially approached Beatles band-mate George Harrison to play lead guitar, but Harrison declined, so Lennon turned to Eric Clapton, who had previously performed with Lennon in the one-off super group, the Dirty Mac. Bassist Klaus Voormann and drummer Alan White soon agreed to perform, along with their assistants, Anthony Fawcett, Terry Doran, and Jill and Dan Richter. Voormann was a long-time friend of Lennon, but White, who was a respected session musician in London but did not know Lennon personally, initially thought that someone was prank calling. It was only when Lennon called a second time did White realize it was actually him.

The group was scheduled to fly to Toronto on 12 September, the day before the concert, but Lennon, Ono, and Clapton were late to arrive at the airport. Lennon had talked to Clapton's management, but Clapton himself did not yet know that Lennon had invited him to perform and was not even aware of the concert. Brower managed to reach Clapton personally and told him to contact Lennon and Ono, who were still in bed. Clapton said he got "a phone call on the day we were to leave and he said that someone had asked him to do that concert and it was that night! So I had to make the airport in an hour." The group had two quick rehearsals before appearing on stage. One was during the transatlantic flight from London to Toronto, though they could not hear the music very well since they were playing unplugged electric instruments. They had another at the concert venue shortly before appearing on stage. Lennon later said that the group "didn't know what to play" since they had not previously performed together, and they eventually settled on a set list consisting of older rock and roll standards, three Lennon-penned Beatle and solo songs, and two longer experimental songs featuring Ono.

Though preparations for the show were rushed and chaotic, Lennon later said that he gained the confidence to leave the Beatles during those few days. Lennon mentioned this to Clapton at the time, and upon returning to London, he privately told Beatles' manager Allen Klein.

== Recording ==
The group played eight songs to a crowd of 20,000 people. Before the start of the Plastic Ono Band's performance, they were introduced by Kim Fowley, and Lennon said to the crowd that the group were going to play only songs that they actually knew. They performed the Beatles' "Yer Blues", because Clapton had performed it with Lennon for The Rolling Stones Rock and Roll Circus, and his two solo songs, "Give Peace a Chance" and "Cold Turkey", the latter of which had its premiere at the festival. (Note: A studio version of "Cold Turkey" was recorded and released before the album came out.) "Cold Turkey", presented as "the newest song that John wrote" by Ono, had Lennon reading the lyrics off a clip-board. Ono selected a song that was to be B-side of "Cold Turkey," "Don't Worry Kyoko (Mummy's Only Looking for Her Hand in the Snow)", which also had its premiere at the festival. Shortly before the band went into "Don't Worry Kyoko", Lennon announced that Ono was "gonna do her thing all over you". The band closed with an electric version of the Wedding Album track "John John (Let's Hope for Peace)", an extended experimental number consisting of her screaming the title repeatedly to the feedback of the electric guitars. Towards the end of Ono's performance, the audience began to boo and whistle, and the band departed the stage leaving their guitars and bass to resonate until Mal Evans turned off the amplifiers. With their stage remarks, Lennon and Ono linked their appearance there to their ongoing campaign for peace.

Lennon went to Abbey Road Studios (Note: Named EMI Studios at the time) on 25 September 1969 to mix the album from their eight-track recordings. While at the session, Lennon finished the stereo master for the album, although he did go back on 20 October to re-do the "Don't Worry Kyoko" stereo master, removing the majority of Ono's vocals from his songs and Clapton's backing vocals. The album is technically a soundtrack recording, being part of the audio portion of the documentary film being made of the festival by D.A. Pennebaker, later released as Sweet Toronto. Lennon and Ono made a deal with Pennebaker to license their portion of the show for record, in exchange for rights to include their appearance. According to the Beatles Monthly, due to the adverse reaction to Ono's performance, Pennebaker removed the segments with Lennon and Ono after limited screenings of the film, later re-edited as Keep on Rockin'. Showtime ultimately presented the performance in 1989, and the full movie appeared later on home video and DVD.

== Release and aftermath ==
Professional ratings
Review scores
Source	Rating
AllMusic	3/5 stars
Robert Christgau	C
MusicHound	3/5
Paste	3/5 stars

The album, released on the same day in both the UK and US, failed to chart in the UK (Note: UK Apple CORE 2001) but peaked at number 10 in the US. (Note: LP: US Apple SW 3362; 8-track: US Apple 8XT-3362; Reel-to-reel: L-3362) It was released to quash any bootleg versions that Lennon was sure would leak onto the market. US editions of the album wrongly stated that the album was recorded in England. The album came with a 13-month calendar that had photos, poems and songs in it, from Lennon's 1964 book In His Own Write, his 1965 book A Spaniard in the Works, and Ono's 1964 book Grapefruit. In the US, Capitol was reluctant at first to issue the album, after the commercial failures of Lennon's and Ono's experimental albums. Lennon recalled in an interview in December 1980 that he had to persuade Capitol to distribute the album: "They said 'This is garbage, we're not going to put it out with her screaming on one side and you doing this sort of live stuff.' And they refused to put it out. But we finally persuaded them that ... people might buy this." In an interview with Rolling Stone, Lennon said that Capitol "were on the [Paul] McCartney bandwagon, which they were on, and they thought that I was just an idiot pissing about with a Japanese broad and the music we were making, like Toronto, they didn't want to put out, because they didn't like that."

Criticism was directed at side two of the LP, the side consisting entirely of two Yoko Ono songs. In a retrospective assessment, Richard Ginell of AllMusic remarks:

Side two, alas, was devoted entirely to Ono's wailing, pitchless, brainless, banshee vocalizing on "Don't Worry Kyoko" and "John John (Let's Hope for Peace)" – the former backed with plodding rock rhythms and the latter with feedback. No wonder you see many used copies of the LP with worn A-sides and clean, unplayed B-sides – and Yoko's "art" is just as irritating today as it was in 1969. But in those days, if you wanted John you had to take the whole package.

In contrast, fellow musicians over the years remarked how Yoko Ono's half was a lot more inspirational and groundbreaking than the first half. Iggy Pop praised Yoko's part as "the part that stands out. The rest of it‘s just kinda pedestrian." Perry Farrell of Jane's Addiction echoed similar feelings, stating that Ono's sound experimentations were a cornerstone of his musical education. Music author Chuck Eddy wrote that despite Clapton's sporadically "really loud" playing, side one's covers were rendered "quaint" by the Flying Lizards' versions ten years later. However, Eddy believed Lennon's "Yer Blues", which features noisier feedback "than the LP's start and end combined", was the album's most disquieting moment. He also described Lennon's grooves on side two as "proto-harmolodic".

Lennon later said he "couldn't remember any of the words but it didn't matter—I just made them all up and we made a great wonderful noise." Carl Perkins said to Lennon after the show that he was "so beautiful you made me cry." A bootleg album of the concert appeared, under the title JL-YO-EC, thanks to an audience recording, which was released about the same time as the official album.

After Lennon's death, the album, along with seven other Lennon albums, was reissued by EMI as part of a box set released in the UK on 15 June 1981. (Note: UK EMI JLB8) The album was reissued in the US in 1982, by Capitol, (Note: US Capitol ST-12239) and again in 1986. The album was originally scheduled to appear on CD for the first time in June 1989, but the plan was scrapped. Ono, with the help of Rob Stevens from Quad Recording, supervised a remix of Live Peace in Toronto 1969 for its compact disc issue, (Note: Europe Apple CDP 7904282) released on 1 May 1995. Two of the remixed tracks feature a variation in Ono's vocals: while "Dizzy Miss Lizzy" has additional backing vocals from Ono, "Money" has fewer backing vocals from Ono. The CD booklet included a 1995 calendar, mimicking the original release. The album is also available from the audiophile label Mobile Fidelity Sound Lab, (Note: US Mobile Fidelity Sound Lab UDCD 763) utilizing the same remix. The booklet for the 2006 Mobile Fidelity release also included a calendar for 2007. A 2009 vinyl reissue from Capitol reverts to the original 1970.

== Track listing ==
Side one

1. "Blue Suede Shoes" (Carl Perkins) – 3:50
2. "Money (That's What I Want)" (Janie Bradford, Berry Gordy) – 3:25
3. "Dizzy, Miss Lizzy" (Larry Williams) – 3:24
4. "Yer Blues" (John Lennon, Paul McCartney) – 4:12
5. "Cold Turkey" (Lennon) – 3:34
6. "Give Peace a Chance" (Lennon, previously Lennon-McCartney) – 3:41

Side two

1. "Don't Worry Kyoko (Mummy's Only Looking for Her Hand in the Snow)" (Yoko Ono) – 4:48
2. "John John (Let's Hope for Peace)" (Ono) – 12:38

== Personnel ==
- John Lennon – lead vocals, rhythm guitar, lead guitar
- Yoko Ono – wind, presence, backing vocals, lead vocal, art
- Eric Clapton – lead guitar, backing vocals
- Klaus Voormann – bass
- Alan White – drums

== Charts ==
Chart performance for Live Peace in Toronto 1969
Chart (1969–1970)	Peak position
Australian Kent Music Report Chart	7
Norwegian Albums (VG-lista)	19
US Billboard 200	10

== Certifications ==
Certification for Live Peace in Toronto 1969
Region	Certification	Certified units/sales
United States (RIAA)	Gold	500,000^{^}
^{^} Shipments figures based on certification alone.
