= Sweet Toronto =

- 1988 VHS videocassette cover
- Directed by: D.A. Pennebaker
- Produced by: Matt Friedman; Peter Hansen; Mark Woodcock
- Starring: John Lennon; Eric Clapton; Klaus Voormann; Alan White; Yoko Ono; Little Richard; Jerry Lee Lewis; Bo Diddley; Chuck Berry
- Cinematography: D.A. Pennebaker; Roger Murphy; Richard Leacock
- Distributed by: BMG
- Release date: 1971
- Running time: 70 minutes
- Language: English

Sweet Toronto (sometimes referred as Sweet Toronto Peace Festival) is a documentary by D.A. Pennebaker of the Toronto Rock and Roll Revival, a one-day festival held September 13, 1969, at Varsity Stadium on the St. George campus of the University of Toronto and attended by some 20,000 people. The event was produced by John Brower and Ken Walker. John Lennon, who seven days later would unofficially resign as a member of the Beatles, played as part of the Plastic Ono Band, whose members also included Yoko Ono, Klaus Voormann, Alan White, and Eric Clapton. Their set was released as the album Live Peace in Toronto 1969.

The video also features a selection of other acts: Jerry Lee Lewis, Little Richard, and Bo Diddley. The concert itself lasted 12 hours and included Alice Cooper and Chicago Transit Authority among other acts, but Pennebaker's documentary focuses mainly on the final hours of the concert. At the time of the performance, Yoko Ono's popularity was sufficiently low that the audience booed and left the Plastic Ono Band performance. There was a similar response from film reviewers at the time. The performances "and this film have grown in interest and watchability since that time, particularly given the rarity of such thorough documentation of these key performers' work in concert."

The film is available on DVD from Shout! Factory, under the name John Lennon and the Plastic Ono Band: Live in Toronto.

== Track listing ==
1. "Bo Diddley"
  - Performed by Bo Diddley
2. "Hound Dog"
  - Performed by Jerry Lee Lewis
3. "Johnny B. Goode"
  - Performed by Chuck Berry
4. "Lucille"
  - Performed by Little Richard
5. "Blue Suede Shoes"
6. "Money (That's What I Want)"
7. "Dizzy, Miss Lizzy"
8. "Yer Blues"
9. "Cold Turkey"
10. "Give Peace a Chance"
11. "Don't Worry Kyoko (Mummy's Only Looking for a Hand in the Snow)"
12. "John, John (Let's Hope for Peace)"
  - Tracks 5–12 performed by The Plastic Ono Band

The complete sets by Berry, Little Richard and Lewis were subsequently released as their own films.
