= Toronto Rock and Roll Revival =

Music festival held in Toronto, Ontario, Canada

- Toronto Rock and Roll Revival 1969, the original 1969 concert poster
- Genre: Rock and roll, blues rock, psychedelic rock
- Dates: September 13, 1969
- Locations: Varsity Stadium; University of Toronto St. George; Toronto, Ontario, Canada
- Coordinates: 43.667°N 79.397°W
- Years active: 1969
- Attendance: 20,000 (approximate)

The Toronto Rock and Roll Revival was a one-day, twelve-hour music festival held in Toronto on September 13, 1969. It featured a number of popular musical acts from the 1950s and 1960s. Held less than a month after Woodstock, the festival is particularly notable for featuring an appearance by John Lennon, Yoko Ono, Eric Clapton, Klaus Voormann, and Alan White as the Plastic Ono Band leading to the release of their Live Peace in Toronto 1969 album. The festival was also the subject of two films: D.A. Pennebaker film Sweet Toronto and the 2022 Ron Chapman film Revival 69: The Concert That Rocked the World.

== History and performers ==
The Toronto Rock and Roll Revival was held at Varsity Stadium, on the University of Toronto's St. George campus with an audience of over 20,000. The originally listed performers for the festival were Whiskey Howl, Bo Diddley, Chicago, Junior Walker and the All Stars, Tony Joe White, Alice Cooper, Chuck Berry, Cat Mother and the All Night News Boys, Jerry Lee Lewis, Gene Vincent, Little Richard, Milkwood (Toronto-based Polydor recording artists), Doug Kershaw, and The Doors. Kim Fowley was listed as the Master of Ceremonies. John Lennon said that "supposedly the Doors were top of the bill". Screaming Lord Sutch was later added to the bill, as was the Toronto area band Flapping. Prior to the addition of Flapping, the only local band on the bill was Whiskey Howl. The appearance of Lennon, Yoko Ono, and The Plastic Ono Band was not publicly known in advance.

Various mutually supportive performances occurred at the festival. The Alice Cooper Band was the backing band for Gene Vincent, while members of Flapping, Ron Marinelli, Danny Taylor, and Hugh Leggat a member of Nucleus were members of the backing band for Chuck Berry. In addition, appearances at the festival served to revitalize the careers of certain performers from the 1950s. For example, according to one reviewer, in relation to Little Richard's performance:

...he and his extremely tight band proceeded to tear through his classics at breakneck speed. With sweat gushing down his heavily made up face, he jumped on the piano and drove the young crowd crazy, exhorting them to get up and dance to blazing numbers like 'Rip It Up', 'Good Golly Miss Molly', and 'Jenny, Jenny'. By the time he finished racing through the closing notes of his 'Long Tall Sally' finale, he was sopping wet with his shirt torn to shreds by the crowd below. In 30 frenetic minutes Little Richard had just made his comeback."

The Doors, as the headlining act, closed the show. The band's appearance at the 1969 festival was their last appearance in Toronto, prior to the 1971 death of Jim Morrison. Unfortunately, the producer of The Doors refused to have the band filmed/recorded, so there is no video recording or legal audio release of the performance. Only an audio attendance recording exists. The band played the following night in Montreal at the Forum.

== Audio and video releases ==
D. A. Pennebaker, who had made the 1967 documentary Dont Look Back, concerning Bob Dylan's 1965 UK tour, and the 1968 documentary Monterey Pop about the 1967 Monterey Pop Festival filmed the Toronto Rock and Roll Revival. Sweet Toronto, a documentary, was released in 1971. As a result of Pennebaker's involvement, the performances of most of the artists were recorded and filmed which has led to many authorized and unauthorized audio and video releases. Authorized video releases include the complete concert performances of Chuck Berry, Jerry Lee Lewis, and Little Richard.

On September 13, 2022, Steven J. Bull debuted "The Forgotten Festival", an innovative multimedia documentary experience at The Royal Conservatory of Music. It featured a live band playing a selection of songs from the 1969 concert, Alan Cross and Bull as co-MCs, and documentary short films featuring interviews with Alice Cooper, Klaus Voormann, Robby Krieger, John Densmore, Alan White, Rob Bowman, and Peter Goddard. Interviews were filmed in 2019 but the COVID-19 pandemic delayed the release. Despite this, it was the first documentary release on the event since Pennebaker's 52 years earlier.

REVIVAL69: The Concert that Rocked the World (2022), filmed in 2021, uses archive footage from Pennebaker's original 16mm film, animation, archive audio, and recent eyewitness interviews.

== Performances ==
These artists' live music performances were issued on album, cassette, and CD:

- Chicago Transit Authority – Toronto Rock 'n' Roll Revival 1969 – Vol. I (Accord 7140, 1981)
- Chuck Berry – Toronto Rock 'n' Roll Revival 1969 – Vol. II (Accord 7171, 1982)
- Chuck Berry – Toronto Rock 'n' Roll Revival 1969 – Vol. III (Accord 7172, 1982)
- Chuck Berry – Toronto Rock 'n' Roll Revival 1969 [Full Complete Concert on CD for First Time!] (Sunset Blvd. 708535799528, 2021)
- Alice Cooper – Toronto Rock 'n' Roll Revival 1969 – Vol. IV (Accord 7162, 1982)
- Bo Diddley – Toronto Rock 'n' Roll Revival 1969 – Vol. V (Accord 7182, 1982)
- John Lennon/Plastic Ono Band – Live Peace in Toronto 1969 (Apple 3362, 1969)
