= The Dirty Mac =

1968 supergroup

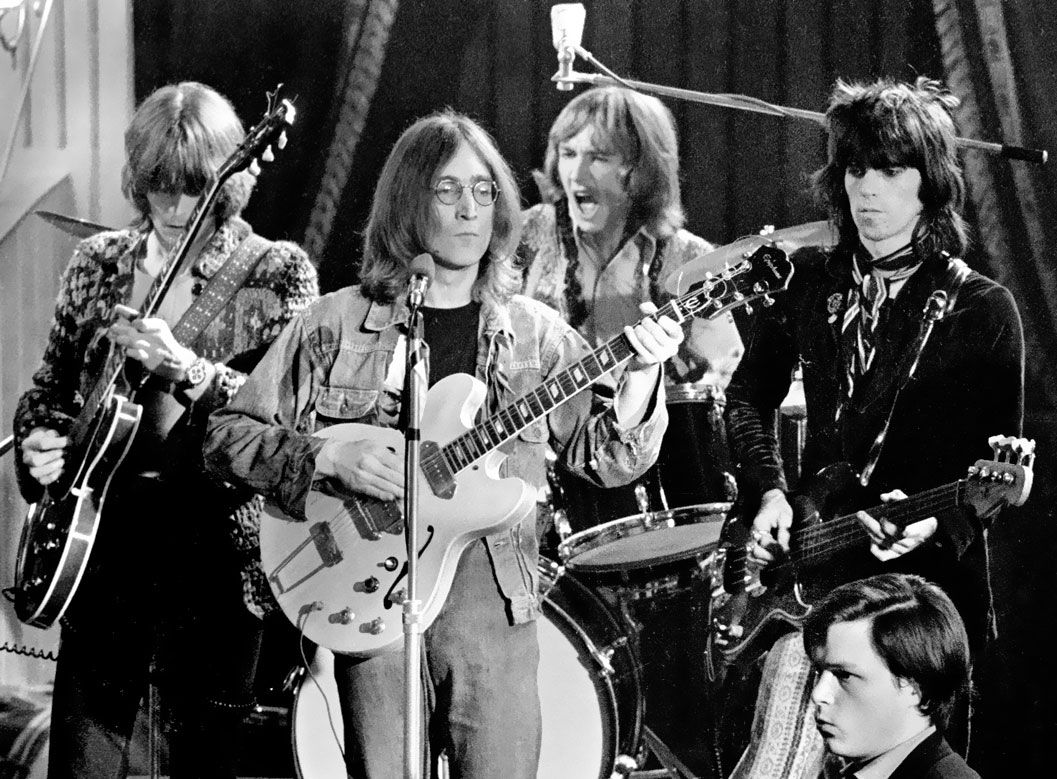
- Eric Clapton, John Lennon, Mitch Mitchell and Keith Richards in December 1968

Background information
- Origin: London, England
- Genres: Hard rock; blues rock
- Years active: 1968
- Past members: John Lennon; Eric Clapton; Mitch Mitchell; Keith Richards

The Dirty Mac was John Lennon's temporary supergroup organized in December 1968 that featured Eric Clapton, Keith Richards, Mitch Mitchell and Lennon under the nom de plume of Winston Leg-Thigh. The band assembled for a one-off performance on the Rolling Stones' TV special titled The Rolling Stones Rock and Roll Circus. The Dirty Mac played Lennon's Beatles composition "Yer Blues" and "Whole Lotta Yoko", an extended blues improvisation in which they were joined by Lennon's then-girlfriend Yoko Ono and violinist Ivry Gitlis. The TV special, which included appearances by the Rolling Stones, the Who and Jethro Tull, among others, did not air as originally planned and was not released officially until October 1996.

Lennon and Clapton later appeared together on the first Plastic Ono Band album, Live Peace in Toronto 1969, which also includes a performance of "Yer Blues".

== Overview ==
Recorded on 11–12 December 1968, The Rolling Stones Rock and Roll Circus was the first time since the formation of the Beatles that Lennon – who was still in the group – had performed in public without them. Aside from singing "All You Need Is Love" live on the 1967 Our World TV special, it was also the first time he had performed live since the Beatles' final tour ended in August 1966. Before the performance, Lennon was filmed chatting with Mick Jagger while eating a bowl of noodles. He listed the other members of the Dirty Mac by their proper names but introduced himself as "Winston Leg-Thigh".

The Dirty Mac performed a rendition of Lennon's Beatles track "Yer Blues". They then went on to back up Yoko Ono and violinist Ivry Gitlis on "Whole Lotta Yoko", essentially an extended blues jam with Ono's improvised free-form vocalisations. The band's name, thought of by Lennon, was a play on that of Fleetwood Mac. When asked what type of guitar amp he wanted to use for the performance, Lennon answered: "One that plays."

In 1996, the Rolling Stones Rock and Roll Circus album was issued, concurrently with the home video of the event. The DVD edition followed in October 2004. Fifteen years later, a limited US remastered theatrical release of the film ran during the first week of April 2019, in conjunction with the North American leg of the Rolling Stones' No Filter Tour. A remaster (4-disc and 3LP vinyl) reissue box set followed on 7 June 2019.

== Members ==
- John Lennon – vocals, guitar
- Eric Clapton – guitar
- Keith Richards – bass
- Mitch Mitchell – drums

Additional musicians on "Whole Lotta Yoko"

- Yoko Ono – vocals
- Ivry Gitlis – violin
