= Yorgos Manessis =

Greek classical pianist and pedagogue

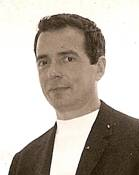
- Yorgos Manessis in front of the Acropolis, Athens in the 1960s
- Born: 26 May 1931; Piraeus, Greece
- Died: 27 January 2015 (aged 83)
- Other name: George Manessis
- Occupations: Greek pianist and pedagogue

Yorgos Manessis (26 May 1931 – 27 January 2015) was a Greek pianist and pedagogue with a short but significant career as a soloist.

== Childhood (1931–1944) ==
Manessis was born on 26 May 1931 in Piraeus, Greece. Soon afterwards, his mother Ioanna Yapapa (a pianist and pupil of Emil von Sauer who had also studied Emile Dalcroze's method at his school in Switzerland) decided that the newly born should be raised in close contact with nature. Thus, the family moved to Manessis’ father's estate in Portoheli, in the region of Argolida (Pelopponisos). There, he had the privilege of a distinctive upbringing, combining freedom and strict discipline (sleep, diet, etc.). Body (gymnastics, Dalcroze Eurhythmics (his mother playing at the piano while he danced), boating, horse riding, trekking, swimming) and mind (piano lessons, attending school, etc.) were equally exercised. It was an upbringing that – according to Manessis himself – laid the foundation for his later artistic endeavours.

== Pedagogical career ==
- Assistant and later replacing Al. Pashkus in Vienna, New York, and Athens (1960–1972), responsible for the preparation of young, talented pianists for careers as soloists. Al. Pashkus was also the Artistic Consultant for great artists such as Yehudi Menuhin, Charles Muench, etc.
- Professor of Piano at the Ribaupierre Institute in Lausanne, Switzerland from 1973 to 1977.
- Professor of Piano at the Piraeus Music Conservatory from 1977 (advanced soloists class).
- Director of the Piano Department of the University of Indianapolis - Athens Branch from February 1998, teaching piano and chamber music.
- Professor of Piano at the Lamia Municipal Conservatory from 1987 to 2002. Responsible for the Post-Graduate Department there since 1995. Notable students include Grigorios Zamparas, Marilina Tzelepi, and Vassilis Theofilidis.
- Professor of Piano at the "Sychrono" Conservatory of Athens from 1998.

== Education ==
- 1947–1951: Studied music with his mother, Ioanna Yapapa-Manessi (student of Em. Sauer, one of Liszt's apprentices). In the same period also studied with Alex Tourneissen (student of Busoni).
- 1950–1951: Attended Economic University of Athens (2 semesters).
- 1951–1959: Munich, High State School of Music. Bachelor in Piano Studies (1956). Studied with: Walter Dorfmueller, Erick Then-Bergh (through whom he gets acquainted with the school of Leimer-Gieseking), Oscar Koebel, Maria Hindemith (with a scholarship of the West Germany Ministry of Education).
- 1954–1957: Took Musicology Courses at the Ludwig-Maximilians-Universität München (audit). At the same period he also studied with Olga Karabai (student of H. Neuhaus) in Nuremberg, where he became acquainted with the Russian School of Neuhaus.
- 1956–1959: Munich, High State School of Music, Diploma in Teaching Music.
- 1959–1962: Vienna and New York – Post-Graduate studies with Alice Pashkus.
- 1962–1972: Continued with Al. Pashkus as his artistic consultant in his career as a pianist.
- 1964–1985: Paris and Switzerland – Research in music philosophy, metaphysics and relationship between quality of life and musical performance.

== Educational activity ==
- 1971–1977: Founder and director of the “Harmony” Artistic Center in Lausanne which became a center of attraction for many well known artists from Europe, Asia, and America, where immense musical performances and conference activities took place. Very favorable coverage in the local press, from artists like Francoise Pollet (soprano-Paris), Thomas Christian (violinist-Vienna), Renee de Mack (flautist-Brussels), and Chantal Bargas-Alleson (violinist-Amsterdam).
- 1987–1997: Director of the Municipal Music Conservatory of Lamia.
- 1988-ongoing: Founder and president of the Cultural Society “The Art of Life” which is responsible for the organization of the Porto Heli Festival, and many cultural seminars in Piraeus, etc.
- 1990–2015 Founder and Director of the Porto Heli International Festival of Art and Culture. Today, the Festival is in cooperation with internationally recognized organizations such as:
  - The Music Academy of Sofia
  - The University of Indianapolis, Athens-USA
  - The Ministry of Culture of the Democratic Republic of Russia
  - Prominent German State Higher Education Schools
- Numerous concerts and seminars are held each year during the months of July and August.

== Professional memberships ==
- November 2000: Founding member of the European Piano Teachers Association (EPTA), and General Secretary of.
- 1980–2006: Founding member and President of the Syndicate Association of music teachers of the Piraeus Conservatory.

== Professional meetings attended ==
On April 8, 1998, he was invited as honored guest by the Russian Ministry of Culture to participate in the 2nd Forum for Professors of Music at the Neuhaus Festival and also to give a masterclass at Moscow.

== Papers presented ==
- About Moderation: An essay on the way pianist Joao Carlos Martins conducts at the piano the work of J.S. Bach for clavichord. Presented in May 1997 by prof. Dr. Hristov, of Sofia University, to Martins himself.
- About Creativity: Presented at the 6th International Esoterical Congress in Berlin, in September 1973.
- Many papers on the following subjects:
1. Interpretation and Way of Life
2. What is new in the 21st Century. “Liveliness” with simplicity and enthusiasm.
3. About the characteristics of sound etc.
4. How to learn a new composition.
5. Interpretation (Aids for those who wish to explore higher ways of communication with the audience).
6. Bases of Kinesiology.
7. Levels of self-control.
8. Concentration/Meditation. “Intermediation” as a prerequisite of a “great” artist, and how to achieve it.
9. Basic knowledge of Psychology. Typical characteristics of each age: 0–7, 7–14, 14–21, 21–28.
10. Principles of the Pashkus method.
11. Monophony, Polyphony and their symbolism.
12. Basic rules of expression.
13. Many other papers presented in various seminars and public lectures mentioned in the “Seminars, Training Programs etc” and “Recognition and Honors’ sections below.

== Other research activity ==
- 1965–1985: Research in Music – Philosophy – Metaphysics and:
1. The relationship between quality of life and musical performance.
2. Sound and musical interpretation.
3. Movement-Piano-Technique-Physiology near the spiritual teacher and pedagogue Omraam Mikhaël Aïvanhov (died in 1985).
- 1986-ongoing: The research goes on with a group of artists and scientists.

== Consulting ==
- 1972-ongoing: musical consultant to young artists.

== Seminars, training programs, etc. conducted for business and industry ==
- 1972–1975 at the Institute de Ribeaupierre in Lausanne, Switzerland: a series of seminars each year
- 1972–1977 at the International Centre for Music “Harmonia” – Lake of Geneva, Switzerland. A 1-month seminar each July and a series of seminars each winter
- 1980-ongoing in Piraeus during the school year
- 1987–1995 at the Lamia Municipal Conservatory during the school year
- 1990 up to present (each July–August) at the Porto Heli International Festival of Arts and Culture
- April 8–18, 1998 in the 2nd Forum for Professors of Music at the Neuhaus Festival in Moscow
- April 7–9, 2000 at the University of Indianapolis (main campus)
- Piano Master Classes and Speeches about interpretation, piano technique, etc.:

== Professional presentations, speeches etc. ==
Manessus had an extensive concert career as a concert pianist in the sixties and seventies, with performances in Vienna, Paris, and Lausanne with widespread critical acclaim. In 1974, he introduced a new pattern to his recitals - at the end of the recital he addressed the audience and discussed music-related subjects of general interest.

== Recognitions and honors ==
July 2007 – He is awarded by the Porto Heli Community for his cultural contribution in the 20 years of the Porto Heli Festival. Autumn 1999 – Lions International: Lions Greece, Award for his Multiple Achievements and Contribution to society.

== Critical reviews ==
Strasbourg “Dernieres Nouvelles”, 16 June 1966. Huge success of George Manesis’ Recital...even if he is a Mediterranean type, he knows how to bridle his musical passion and present it with an exterior calm entirely Northern which never departs from a solemnity completely faithful to the composers he interprets.

Vienna “Kurier”, January 1962...he succeeded in being dominated and appreciated completely...Based on healthy harmony and mature technique, he majestically structured Beethoven's 100th with a masculine lament of pain and a broad sculptured fugue.

Monte Carlo “Nice Matin”, 14 June 1958...Powerful success by George Manesis...He possesses all the qualities which characterize consummate great talent, great sensitivity, deep musicality and remarkable technique.

Zurich “Tagesanzeiger”, February 1962...The gifted artist George Manesis created a splendid impression...what ribystm vugiriys and ardent playing. The introductions to his works had such force that they captivated you.

Paris, 18 March 1955, “Television Aimee de Cardevaque”...A great talent with amazing self-discipline and a musicality of rare depth.

Athens “Independent Press”, April 1962...He is the poet of the piano. He creates atmosphere. He illuminates the minutest details of the melodies and presents them in relief. What rare self-discipline...he never forgets for an instant that he is a musician.

New York “New York Herald”, February 1969...a beautiful sound...a dignified and sincere interpretation with moments of infinite beauty. Priscilla Witter.

Strasbourg “Dernieres Nouvelles”, 1966. A great pianist...it was incredible how with only his left hand he managed (in the Chaconne Bach-Brahms) to create the impression of a whole orchestra. A night which those who experienced it will discuss and remember for many years.

Paris” L’ Entre Acte”, March 1969...A great artist with very rare gifts...A wonderful night...confident technique with merverous clarity. He alternates verve with refinement and tenderness. Nicole Claude.

Schaffhausen, 27 October 1966, “Schaffhausen Nachrichten”...a truly exceptionally gifted pianist...with a totally remarkable artistic strength and incredible powers of concentration and imagination...we are still completely under the spell of this rare creative force.

Munich, December 1951, “Prof. Dr. Knappe Dean of the higher State School of Music, Munich”...The case of George Manesis is unusual and fascinating, mainly for his exceptional sound.

Lausanne “Feuille D’Avis”, October 1966...What a powerful, sumptuous revival...this was music drawn from a very real inner nead...A singular impression...the combination of the most difficult multi-scaled and multi-tempo scores in a magnificent cohesion...it was a great delight (for the VI volume of Bela Bartok's “MICROCOSMOS”).

Athens “Ethnikos Kirix”, April 1962...I am still under the magic of Manesis’ sound, that wonderful sound which exudes creativity and color. Manesis devotes his whole self to the performance...but always with incomparable refinement and indescribable spirituality.

London, October 1962. Sir Yehudi Menuhin: “George Manesis is an exceptional pianist and serious musician”.

== Professionally related community activities ==
1990 at the city of Porto Heli; Cultural Anthropology lectures, classes, seminars, etc. within the Porto Heli International Festival of Art and Culture. Participation of the Porto Heli Festival to the International Choir Meetings of Hermioni, Greece.
