= Alice Pashkus =

Violin and piano teacher

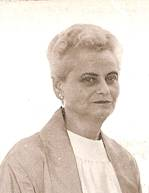
- Alice Pashkus in front of the Acropolis of Athens in the 1960s
- Born: February 21, 1911
- Died: 1972 (aged 60–61)
- Occupations: Violin and piano teacher

Alice Pashkus (1911–1972) was born on February 21, 1911, in Velbert, Germany. According to Jon Verbalis, she had piano tuition from Elie Robert Schmitz. She studied medicine but after meeting Theodore Pashkus, she dedicated herself to instrumental (mostly violin and piano) pedagogy. Her most influential work was carried out in collaboration with her husband Theodore. For many years the couple were very much in demand as specialists in musicians' physical as well as psychological problems. Among their most famous pupils were Ossy Renardy, Yehudi Menuhin, Ivry Gitlis, Michèle Auclair, Franco Gulli and Enzo Porta. Alice Pashkus also gave instruction to pianists Yorgos Manessis and Jon Verbalis.
