= Ana-Maria Vera =

American pianist

- Born: April 15, 1965 (age 61); Washington, D.C., United States
- Occupation: pianist
- Years active: 1973–present

Ana-Maria Vera (born 15 April 1965 in Washington, D.C.) is an American pianist of Dutch and Bolivian origin. Her father (Mario Vera) was born in La Paz, Bolivia of mixed Spanish and Aymara heritage; her mother (Marianna Woudstra) was born in the Netherlands.

She studied under Leon Fleisher in Baltimore, Maryland. At the age of 8, in 1973, she debuted as a soloist with the U.S. Air Force Symphony Orchestra. At age nine, she performed at the Teatro Municipal in La Paz, Bolivia. At age eleven, she performed at the White House for President Jimmy Carter.

As a recording artist for Philips, she was awarded a Gold Record by the Philips' Dutch subsidiary label Phonogram B.V. for her 1976 LP of the Haydn D Major and Mozart K. 246 concerts performed with the Rotterdam Philharmonic Orchestra.

In 1982, the Bolivian postal service issued a stamp in honor of Bolivian youth featuring Ana-Maria Vera.

Together with her brother Armando Vera (a violinist), she is the founder and promoter of Bolivia Clasica, a not-for-profit organization that develops classical musicians in Bolivia. In 2014, Bolivia Clasica sponsored a visit to Bolivia by violin virtuoso and acclaimed conductor Jaime Laredo. Laredo also assisted in conducting orchestral arrangements of pieces by Bolivian composers ("Collita" and "Viva mi patria Bolivia"). In addition, Laredo gave master classes to young Bolivian musicians.

Ana-Maria Vera lives in London with her husband and daughter. She is also a seasonal resident of La Paz.

== Discography ==
=== Solo recordings ===
- Mozart & Haydn: Piano Concertos (Philips, c. 1976)
  - Wolfgang Amadeus Mozart – Piano Concerto No. 11 in F major, K. 246
  - Joseph Haydn – Piano Concerto in D major
  - Rotterdam Philharmonic Orchestra, conducted by Edo de Waart
  - Recorded when Vera was 11 years old.
- Piano Recital (Philips, 1982)
  - Works by Frédéric Chopin, Felix Mendelssohn, and Claude Debussy
  - Solo piano recital (LP release)
- Goyescas – Enrique Granados (Signum Classics, 2009)
  - Granados – Goyescas
  - Solo piano

=== Chamber music ===
- Spanish Landscapes (Universal Music Spain, 2013)
  - With violinist Leticia Moreno
  - Joaquín Turina – Poema de una sanluqueña
  - Manuel de Falla – Siete canciones populares españolas
  - Enrique Granados – Violin Sonata
  - Works by Isaac Albéniz, Pablo de Sarasate, Ernesto Halffter, and Eduard Toldrà

=== Compilation appearances ===
- Vera's recordings have appeared on various classical compilation albums, including collections such as 100 Calm Classical Masterpieces.

=== Notes ===
- Vera's early recordings for Philips were made during her career as a child prodigy and received international recognition.
- Her later discography emphasizes Spanish repertoire and chamber music collaborations.
