= Ivry Gitlis =

Israeli violinist (1922–2020)

Ivry Gitlis עברי גיטליס
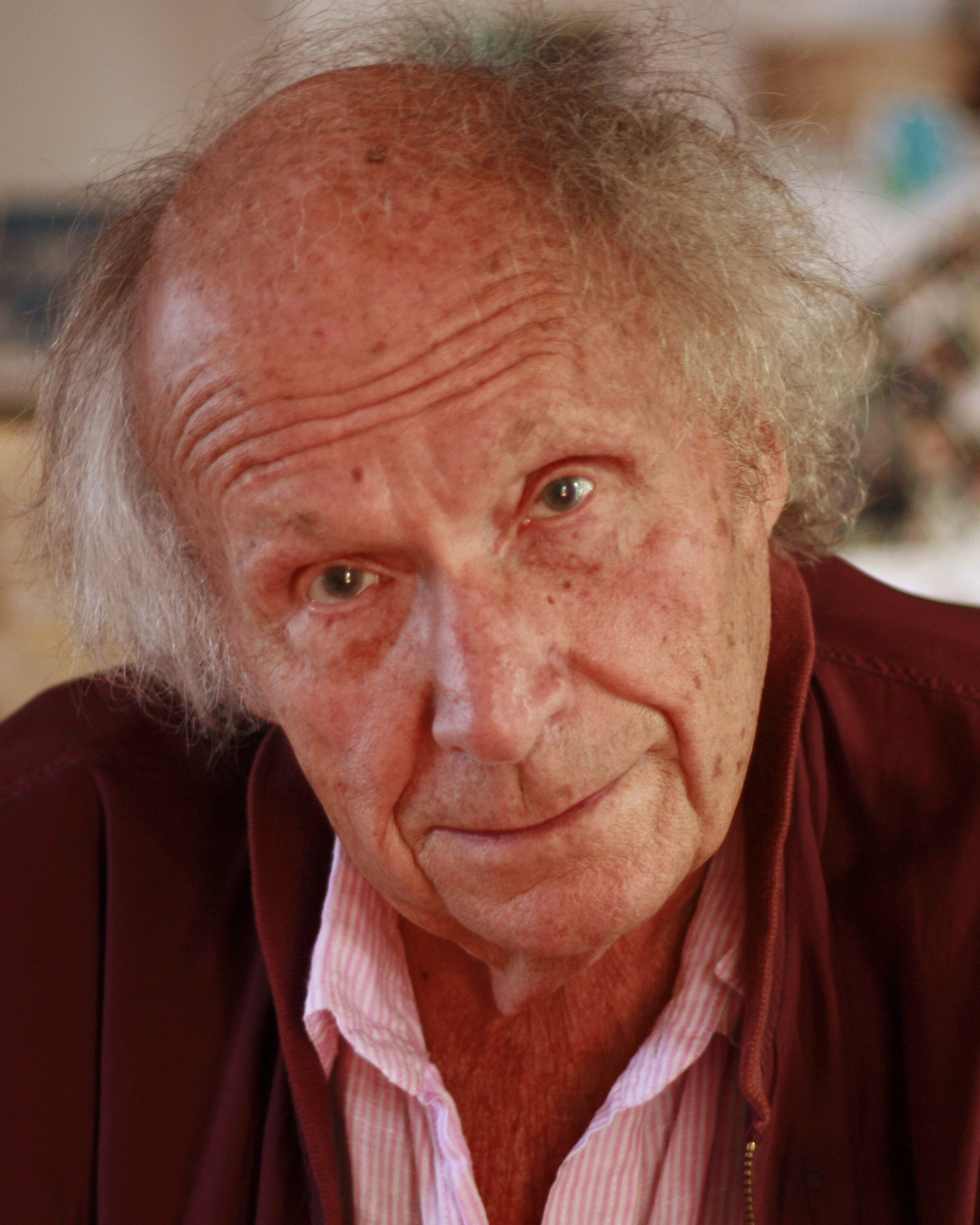
- Ivry Gitlis at home (Paris, 2010)

Background information
- Born: Yitzhak-Meir Gitlis; 25 August 1922; Haifa, Palestine Mandate (now Israel)
- Died: 24 December 2020 (aged 98) Paris, France
- Genre: Classical
- Occupations: Violinist, pedagogue
- Instrument: Violin
- Years active: 1937–2019

Ivry Gitlis (Hebrew: עברי גיטליס; 25 August 1922 – 24 December 2020) was an Israeli virtuoso violinist and UNESCO Goodwill Ambassador. He performed with the world's top orchestras, including the London Philharmonic, New York Philharmonic, Berlin Philharmonic, Vienna Philharmonic, and Philadelphia Orchestra.

== Early life and education ==
Yitzhak-Meir (Isaac) Gitlis was born on 25 August 1922 in Haifa, Mandatory Palestine to Jewish parents Asher and Hedva Gitlis, who emigrated in 1921 from Kamianets-Podilskyi, Ukraine.

Gitlis acquired his first violin when he was five years old and started lessons under Mme Velikovsky together with his friend Zvi Zeitlin. He then studied privately with Mira Ben-Ami, a pupil of Joseph Szigeti. When he was eight, she arranged for him to play for Bronisław Huberman, which prompted a fundraising campaign to allow him to study in France.

In 1933, he arrived with his mother in Paris and started to take lessons with Marcel Chailley, husband of the pianist Céliny Chailley-Richez. Being very close to their family, he was introduced to George Enescu and Jacques Thibaud. In that period, he decided to change his birth name (Isaac) to Ivry. At 11, Gitlis (Jitlis) entered the Conservatoire de Paris in the class of Jules Boucherit, and graduated in 1935.

From 1938 to 1940, his teachers included George Enescu and Jacques Thibaud in Paris and Carl Flesch in Spa, Belgium and later in London.

== Career ==
=== World War II ===
In 1940, during World War II, he went to London where he first worked for two years in a war factory and was then assigned to the artists branch of the British Army. He gave numerous concerts for the Allied soldiers and in war factories. After the war he made his successful debut with the London Philharmonic Orchestra and subsequently played with the BBC and all other principal orchestras of Great Britain.

=== 1950s ===
In 1951, as suggested by his teacher Alice Pashkus, he participated in the Long-Thibaud Competition in Paris, where he took fifth place. During the preliminary stages of the competition, a rumor circulated that he had stolen a Stradivarius violin during the war, which caused a scandal on the day of the final. Six years after the fall of Hitler, being a Jew in France was still causing debate. In the same year, Gitlis made his debut in Paris, playing in a recital at the Salle Gaveau, sponsored by the music manager Marcel de Valmalète (9 July 1951).

In those years Ivry Gitlis already ranked with the foremost young masters of his instrument in the world. He started the study of the violin at the age of five. His debut was made shortly after that and he so impressed the noted virtuoso, Bronislaw Huberman, that he was sent to Paris to study. At the age of 11, the boy won first place among 150 competitors for admission to the Paris Conservatoire, and at 13, he got "Premier Prix" at graduation from the Conservatoire. Gitlis continued his studies with such noted virtuosi as Georges Enesco, Jacques Thibaud and Theodore Pashkus, after which he embarked on a European concert tour. During the war, Gitlis remained in London where he performed for the Armed Forces in hundreds of concerts. In recent years he has been soloist with such orchestras as the London Philharmonic, London Symphony, Liverpool Philharmonic, etc. He has featured contemporary music on his program ranging from works of Bartok to Lennox Berkeley, Ivor Walsworth and Hindemith, as well as continuing his programs of the music of the classics. Further tours of the European continent strengthened critical belief that Ivry Gitlis had become one of the world's greatest violinists. (text extracted from: Don Gabor archives, ©1950). In 1955 he moved to the United States where he met Jascha Heifetz. There he made several tours, managed by Sol Hurok, including those conducted by Eugene Ormandy (Tchaikovsky, in Philadelphia) and George Szell (Sibelius, on 15,16 and 18 December 1955 in New York). In Europe, between 1954 and 1955, he recorded for the Vox label concertos by Berg (Violin Concerto "To the memory of an angel", coupled with "Chamber Concerto" -Vox PL 8660- which was awarded a "Grand Prix du Disque" in 1954), Tchaikovsky, Mendelssohn, Stravinsky (Violin Concerto, coupled with "Duo Concertant") and with the conductor Jascha Horenstein, Bartók, Bruch and Sibelius. His recording of Bartók's 2nd Violin Concerto and Solo Violin Sonata -Vox PL 9020- received the "Best Record of the Year" award from the New York Herald Tribune in 1955.

=== 1960s ===
In 1963, he was the first Israeli violinist to play in the Soviet Union. He gave a series of concerts under the cultural exchange program of the Soviet Union and Israel, starting in Vilnius (23 October 1963). His other concerts were given in Moscow, Leningrad, Kyiv and Odesa.

In 1968, he participated in The Rolling Stones Rock and Roll Circus film project, performing "Whole Lotta Yoko" with Yoko Ono and The Dirty Mac.

Many composers were fascinated by his sound and way of playing, among whom René Leibowitz who dedicated his Violin Concerto, Op. 50 (1958) to him; Roman Haubenstock-Ramati with "Sequences" for Violin and Orchestra (1958); Bruno Maderna writing "Pièce pour Ivry" (1971), which Gitlis never recorded commercially, but recorded live in Paris on 25 May 1983; Yannis Xenakis with "Mikka", which Gitlis premièred in 1972; Charles Harold Bernstein with two works for solo violin, inspired by Gitlis, "Rhapsodie Israélienne" and "Romantic Suite" (1984).

=== 1970s ===
In 1972, Gitlis founded the Festival de Vence, famous for its innovative programming. He was also the inspirer and organiser of the Saint André de Cubzac, Alfortville and Bonifacio Music Festivals.

In 1975, he undertook a dramatic role, as Hypnotist in François Truffaut's film, The Story of Adele H.

He often visited Japan, where he was very popular.

=== 1990s ===
In 1990, Gitlis was designated UNESCO Goodwill Ambassador. His stated aim was the "support of education and culture of peace and tolerance". He performed at the opening event of the International Bioethics Committee's 3rd session in 1995.

=== 2000s ===
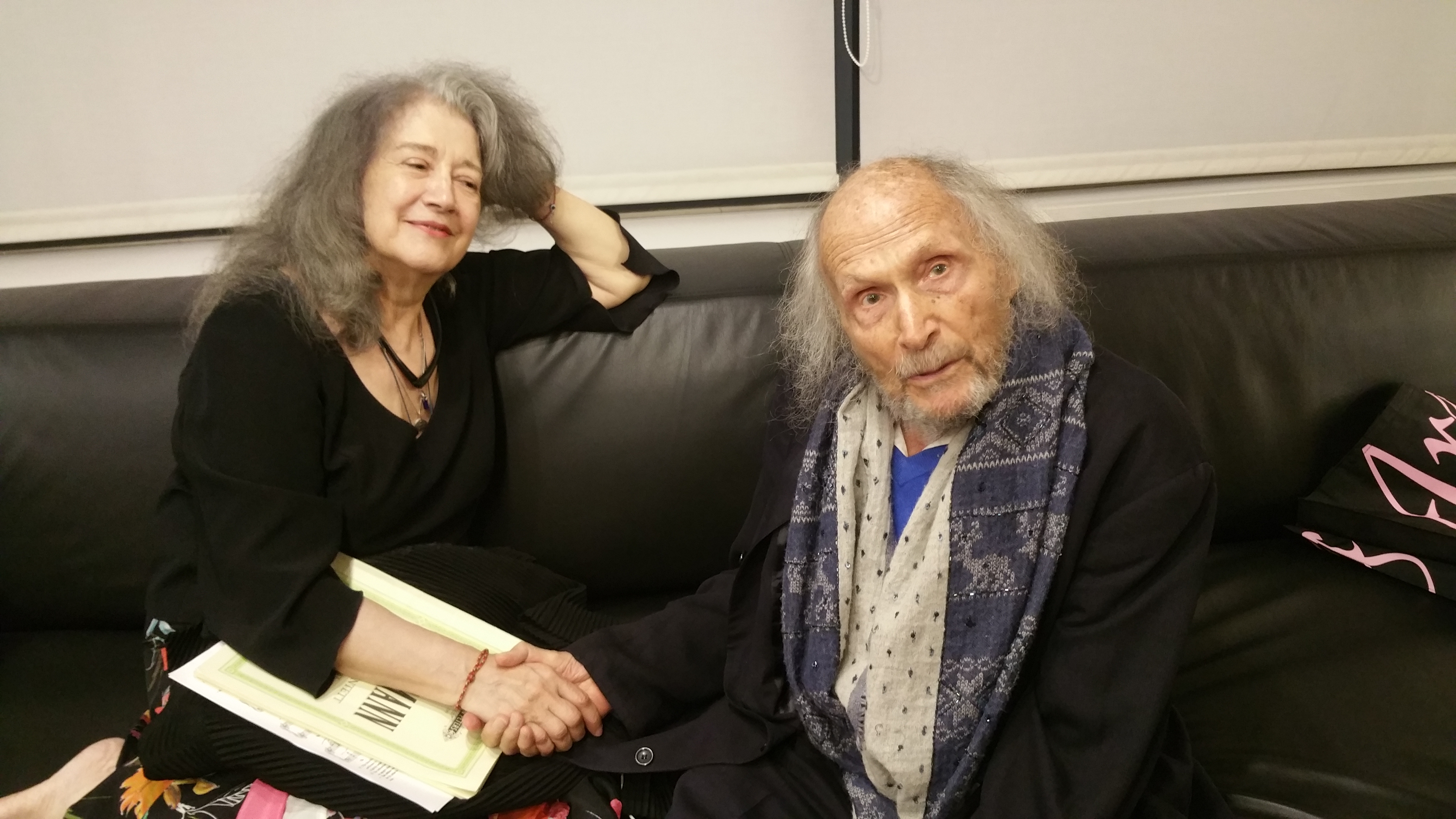
Gitlis with pianist Martha Argerich, after a joint performance at the Israel Philharmonic, Tel Aviv, 2018

Ivry Gitlis was a commentator (along with Itzhak Perlman) on the DVD The Art of Violin (2000), which showcases violin performances and gives biographical details of many of the great violinists of the twentieth century.

In 2008, he became patron of the Paris-based association "Inspiration(s)", whose aim is to make classical music accessible to all. He was a Fellow of the Royal Northern College of Music.

He was a distinguished guest of the International Master Course for violinists and string players at Keshet Eilon Music Center.

== Violins ==
At various stages in his career, Gitlis played on a 1699 Giovanni Battista Rogeri, which he sold to famed violin author Sidney Bowden, the 1737 "Chant du Cygne" Antonio Stradivari, and the 1740 "Ysaye" Guarneri del Gesù. Ivry Gitlis owned the 1713 "Sancy" Antonio Stradivari and a violin by Émile Marcel Français, Paris 1944 (won as a prize for the 1951 "Thibaud Competition").

== Quotes ==
Dear young colleagues of the up-and-coming generation, please have the courage to be yourselves, to take risks and not be copies of your recordings or of others'. Practice your instrument in order to free yourself from any psycho-technical constraint, to be able to create when you play. Listen to your inner ear, which is connected directly to your heart and spirit, the one that tells you what you feel is you! And the one you don't feel isn't you. Remember that a beautiful "wrong" note by a Kreisler, a Thibaud, a Casals or a Callas is worth more than a thousand so-called "right" notes and that playing that is hygienically and clinically correct is not necessarily a sign of good health! Take heart! Good health to you!
(Ivry Gitlis – January 2007)

- "... don't be so polite with the music, it's like being in love!" (IG, during a masterclass, 31 October 2011)
- "Sheet music is a bunch of black marks; they have no significance ... I play violin, but in order to play well you have to be much more than a violin player. There is an entire world that lives together with it, like the currents in the ocean; and in any event, often I don't use sheet music at all, but improvise." (IG, October 2012)
- "... rubato is the art of playing in tempo..." (IG)
- (on answering the question: "what is your motto?") "... to be alive, to be aware, to hear, to know, to feel, to see, to love, to be loved a little bit sometimes." (IG, July 2011)

== Family ==
Ivry Gitlis was married from 1959 to 1960 to American director and writer Sandra Hochman; also to French Actress France Lambiotte, with whom he had one child, Raphaëlle; and until his death was married to German actress Sabine Glaser, mother of three of his four children, Nessie, David and Johnathan.

== Death ==
Since the end of the 1960s, Gitlis resided in Paris, France. He died there on 24 December 2020 at the age of 98.

== Ivry Gitlis Edition - Rhine Classics ==
According to the Ivry Gitlis Edition page at the 'Rhine Classics' label website.

- RH-011 | 2CD | Ivry Gitlis 'the early years, birth of a legend'
- RH-019 | 9CD | Ivry Gitlis 'in memoriam' - inédits et introuvables
- RH-024 | 1CD | Ivry Gitlis plays Bach

== Audio/video recordings ==
Sortable lists, in chronological order.

=== Commercial – official, studio and live releases ===
composer	arranger	work	collaborating artists	rec. date (yyyy/mm/dd)	first release	Audio / Video	reprint / note
Paganini, Niccolò	Wilhelmj, August	Violin Concerto No.1 in D Major (reorchestration of I.Allegro maestoso & Cadenza: É.Sauret)	The Austrian Symphony Orchestra / Kurt Wöss	1950, Vienna	LP Remington RLP-149-20 ℗1951	A	9CD Rhine Classics RH-019 ℗2021
Berg, Alban		Violin Concerto “To the Memory of an Angel”	Vienna Symphony (Pro Musica) Orchestra / William Strickland	30.III.1954, Vienna, Konzerthaussaal	LP Vox PL-8660 (p)1954	A	Grand Prix du Disque 1954 / CD Vox, 1999
Berg, Alban		Kammerkonzert (Chamber Concerto) for Violin, Piano & 13 winds	Vienna Symphony (Pro Musica) Orchestra Wind Ensemble / Charlotte Lois Zelka, piano / Harold Byrns	30.III.1954, Vienna, Konzerthaussaal	LP Vox PL-8660 (p)1954	A	9CD Rhine Classics RH-019
Mendelssohn, Felix		Violin Concerto in E minor, Op.64	Vienna Symphony (Pro Musica) Orchestra / Hans Swarowsky	1954, Vienna	LP Vox PL-8840 (p)1954)	A	3CD Vox, 1992
Tchaikovsky, Pyotr Ilyich		Violin Concerto in D major, Op.35	Vienna Symphony (Pro Musica) Orchestra / Heinrich Hollreiser	VII.1954, Vienna	LP Vox PL-8840 (p)1954	A	3CD Vox, 1992
Bartók, Béla		Violin Concerto No.2, Sz.112, BB 117	Vienna Symphony (Pro Musica) Orchestra / Jascha Horenstein	IX.1954, Vienna	LP Vox PL-9020 (p)1955	A	3CD Vox, 1992
Bartók, Béla		Sonata for solo Violin, Sz.117, BB 124		IX.1954, Vienna	LP Vox PL-9020 (p)1955)	A	3CD Vox, 1992
Stravinsky, Igor		Violin Concerto in D (1931)	Concerts Colonne Orchestra / Harold Byrns	16.VI.1956, Paris, Theatre Pigalle	LP Vox PL-9410 (p)1956	A	CD Vox, 1999
Stravinsky, Igor		Duo Concertant, for Violin and Piano	Charlotte Lois Zelka, piano	1955, Vienna	LP Vox PL-9410 (p)1956	A	9CD Rhine Classics RH-019 ℗2021
Bruch, Max		Violin Concerto No.1 in G minor, Op.26	Vienna Symphony (Pro Musica) Orchestra / Jascha Horenstein	10.IX.1955, Vienna	LP Vox PL-9660 (p)1956	A	3CD Vox, 1992
Sibelius, Jean		Violin Concerto in D minor, Op.47	Vienna Symphony (Pro Musica) Orchestra / Jascha Horenstein	10.IX.1955, Vienna	LP Vox PL-9660 (p)1956	A	3CD Vox, 1992
Sibelius, Jean		Violin Concerto in D minor, Op.47	New York Philharmonic Orchestra / George Szell	18.XII.1955, New York	2CD+DVD Doremi DHR-7981-3 (p)2010	A	"1955 USA début"
Hindemith, Paul		Violin Concerto〈1939〉	Westphalia Symphony Orchestra / Hubert Reichert	1961	LP Vox PL 11980	A	CD Vox (p)1999
Leibowitz, René		Violin Concerto, Op.50 (1958, dedicated to Ivry Gitlis)	Radio-Philharmonie Hannover des NDR / René Leibowitz	20.I.1961, Hannover, Grosse Sendesaal	2CD+DVD Doremi DHR-7981-3 (p)2010	A	w.p. at "Tag der Neuen Musik 1961"
Hindemith, Paul		Violin Concerto〈1939〉	SO des Südwestfunks Baden-Baden / Hans Rosbaud	14.IX.1962, Baden-Baden, Studio 5	CD Music&Arts MACD0627 (p)1990	A	
Brahms, Johannes		Violin Sonata No.3 in D minor, Op.108 (I. Allegro)	Tasso Janopoulo, piano	5.VI.1962, Paris	DVD EMI classic archive 50 (p)2007	V	
Bartók, Béla		Sonata for solo Violin, Sz.117, BB 124 (III. Melodia. Adagio)		5.VI.1962, Paris	DVD EMI classic archive 50 (p)2007	V	
Elgar, Edward		La Capricieuse, Op.17	Tasso Janopoulo, piano	5.VI.1962, Paris	DVD EMI classic archive 50 (p)2007	V	
Wieniawski, Henryk		Polonaise brillante (No.1) in D major, Op.4	Tasso Janopoulo, piano	5.VI.1962, Paris	DVD EMI classic archive 50 (p)2007	V	
Tchaikovsky, Pyotr Ilyich		Violin Concerto in D major, Op.35	Orchestre National de l'ORTF / Francesco Mander	1965/6/13, Paris	DVD EMI classic archive 50, 2007	V	
Paganini, Niccolò		Violin Concerto No.1 in D Major, Op.6 (Cadenza: Émile Sauret)	Warsaw National Philharmonic Orchestra / Stanisław Wisłocki	17–23.II.1966, Warsaw	LP Philips 6504 019 / Polskie Nagrania	A	2CD Philips 446189-2 L'homme au violon (p)1994
Paganini, Niccolò		Violin Concerto No.2 in B minor, Op.7 “La Campanella” (Cadenza: Ivry Gitlis)	Warsaw National Philharmonic Orchestra / Stanisław Wisłocki	17–23.II.1966, Warsaw	LP Philips 6504 019 / Polskie Nagrania	A	2CD Philips 446189-2 L'homme au violon (p)1994
Paganini, Niccolò		Violin Concerto No.2 in B minor, Op.7 “La Campanella” (III. Rondò)	Warsaw National Philharmonic Orchestra / Stanisław Wisłocki	audio: 17–23.II.1966, Warsaw + video: 2.X.1966, Paris	DVD: EMI classic archive 50	V	video playback w. Philips audio rec.
Franck, César		Violin Sonata in A major, M.8 -segments-	Philippe Entremont, piano	14.V.1966, Paris	2CD+DVD Doremi DHR-7981-3 (p)2010	V	
Hindemith, Paul		Violin Concerto〈1939〉	Bamberger Symphoniker / Sixten Ehrling	19.V.1966, Bamberg, Dominikanerbau	2CD+DVD Doremi DHR-7981-3 (p)2010	A	
Paganini, Niccolò	Kreisler, Fritz	“La Campanella” (III. Rondò, from Violin Concerto No.2)	Tasso Janopoulo, piano	V.1967, Paris	LP Philips 6504 023 (p)1967	A	--
Paganini, Niccolò	Kreisler, Fritz	Caprice No.20, Op.1, MS 25	Tasso Janopoulo, piano	V.1967, Paris	LP Philips 6504 023 (p)1967	A	--
Paganini, Niccolò	Kreisler, Fritz	Caprice No.13, Op.1, MS 25	Tasso Janopoulo, piano	V.1967, Paris	LP Philips 6504 023 (p)1967	A	--
Paganini, Niccolò	Auer, Leopold	Caprice No.24, Op.1, MS 25	Tasso Janopoulo, piano	V.1967, Paris	LP Philips 6504 023 (p)1967	A	--
Paganini, Niccolò		I Palpiti, Op.13, MS 77	Tasso Janopoulo, piano	V.1967, Paris	LP Philips 6504 023 (p)1967	A	5CD Decca 5346246 Ivry Gitlis portrait (p)2013
Paganini, Niccolò		Cantabile in D major, Op.17, MS 109	Tasso Janopoulo, piano	V.1967, Paris	LP Philips 6504 023 (p)1967	A	5CD Decca 5346246 Ivry Gitlis portrait (p)2013
Paganini, Niccolò		Sonatina in E minor, Op.3 No.6, MS 27	Tasso Janopoulo, piano	V.1967, Paris	LP Philips 6504 023 (p)1967	A	5CD Decca 5346246 Ivry Gitlis portrait (p)2013
Paganini, Niccolò		Minuetto in F major, for Violin and Guitar/Piano 〈1836/37〉	Tasso Janopoulo, piano	V.1967, Paris	LP Philips 6504 023 (p)1967	A	5CD Decca 5346246 Ivry Gitlis portrait (p)2013
Paganini, Niccolò	Auer, Leopold	Caprice No.24, Op.1, MS 25	Tasso Janopoulo, piano	31.V.1967, Paris	2CD+DVD Doremi DHR-7981-3 (p)2010	V	video session from the Philips audio recording
Berg, Alban		Violin Concerto “To the Memory of an Angel” (1935)	Orchestre National de l'ORTF / Fritz Rieger	14.III.1967, Paris, Maison de la Radio	5CD Decca 5346246 Ivry Gitlis portrait, 2013	A	
Saint-Saëns, Camille	Ysaÿe, Eugène	“Caprice pour violon et orchestre” in D major (Etude en forme de Valse, Op.52 No.6)	Orchestre National de l'Opéra de Monte-Carlo / Edouard van Remoortel	7–10.III.1968, Monte-Carlo	LP Philips 6504 055	A	5CD Decca 5346246 Ivry Gitlis portrait, 2013
Saint-Saëns, Camille		Violin Concerto No.2 in C major, Op.58	Orchestre National de l'Opéra de Monte-Carlo / Edouard van Remoortel	7–10.III.1968, Monte-Carlo	LP Philips 6504 055	A	2CD Philips 446189-2 L'homme au violon, 1994 / 5CD Decca 5346246 Ivry Gitlis portrait, 2013
Saint-Saëns, Camille		Violin Concerto No.4 “Inachevé” (Morceau de concert) in G major, Op.62	Orchestre National de l'Opéra de Monte-Carlo / Edouard van Remoortel	7–10.III.1968, Monte-Carlo	LP Philips 6504 055	A	2CD Philips 446189-2 L'homme au violon, 1994 / 5CD Decca 5346246 Ivry Gitlis portrait, 2013
Wieniawski, Henryk		Capriccio-Valse in E major, Op.7	Tasso Janopoulo, piano	12.IV.1968, Paris	DVD EMI classic archive 50, 2007	V	
Franck, César		Violin Sonata in A major (II. Allegro – Quasi lento – Tempo I°)	Georges Pludermacher, piano	9.II.1969, Paris	2CD+DVD Doremi DHR-7981-3, 2010	V	
Wieniawski, Henryk		Violin Concerto No.1 in F-sharp minor, Op.14 (version pratique, with short orch.intro 1st mvmt)	Orchestre National de l'Opéra de Monte-Carlo / Jean-Claude Casadesus	3–8.VII.1969, Monte-Carlo	LP Philips 6504 001 (p)1969	A	2CD Philips 446189-2 'L'homme au violon' (p)1994 / 5CD Decca 5346246 'Ivry Gitlis portrait' (p)2013
Wieniawski, Henryk		Violin Concerto No.2 in D minor, Op.22	Orchestre National de l'Opéra de Monte-Carlo / Jean-Claude Casadesus	3–8.VII.1969, Monte-Carlo	LP Philips 6504 001 (p)1969	A	2CD Philips 446189-2 'L'homme au violon' (p)1994 / 5CD Decca 5346246 'Ivry Gitlis portrait' (p)2013
Brahms, Johannes		Double Concerto for violin and cello in A minor, Op.102	Orchestre National de l'ORTF / Maurice Gendron, cello / Michel Tabachnik	1970/12/08, Paris	2CD+DVD Doremi DHR-7981-3, 2010	A	5CD Decca 5346246 'Ivry Gitlis portrait' (p)2013
Saint-Saëns, Camille		Introduction et rondo capriccioso in A minor, Op.28	Georges Pludermacher, piano	17.XI.1971, Paris	DVD EMI classic archive 50, 2007	V	
Paganini, Niccolò		Violin Concerto No.2 in B minor, Op.7 “La Campanella” (Cadenza: Ivry Gitlis)	Stuttgart Radio Symphonieorkester / Stanislaw Skrowaczewski	13.VI.1972, Stuttgart	2CD+DVD Doremi DHR-7981-3 (p)2010	A	2CD SWR MUSIC SWR19005CD (p)2016
Haubenstock-Ramati, Roman		“Sequences” für Violine und Orchester (1958)	SWR Sinfonieorchester Freiburg / Hans Rosbaud	1962, studio SWR Freiburg		A	2CD SWR MUSIC SWR19005CD (p)2016
Haubenstock-Ramati, Roman		“Sequences” für Violine und Orchester (1958)	ORF-Symphonieorchester / Milan Horvat	29.XI.1972, Vienna	LP Amadeo 415 314–1 (p)1984	A	no CD
Moszkovski, Moritz	Sarasate, Pablo de	Guitarre, Op.45 No.2	Georges Pludermacher, piano	21.VIII.1973, Paris	DVD EMI classic archive 50 (p)2007	V	
Albéniz, Isaac	Kreisler, Fritz	Malagueña, Op.165 No.3 (from "España")	Georges Pludermacher, piano	21.VIII.1973, Paris	DVD EMI classic archive 50 (p)2007	V	
Franck, César		Violin Sonata in A major, M.8 (II. Allegro – Quasi lento – Tempo I°)	Georges Pludermacher, piano	5.X.1974, Paris	2CD+DVD Doremi DHR-7981-3 (p)2010	V	
Mendelssohn, Felix		Violin Concerto in E minor, Op.64 (III. Allegro molto vivace -no intro-)	Orchestra conducted by Michel Legrand	5.X.1974, Paris	2CD+DVD Doremi DHR-7981-3 (p)2010	V	
Bartók, Béla		Sonata for solo Violin, Sz.117, BB 124 (III. Melodia. Adagio -fragment-)		22.XI.1974, Paris	2CD+DVD Doremi DHR-7981-3 (p)2010	V	
Paganini, Niccolò		24 Caprices for solo violin, Op.1, MS 25		I-III.1976, studio Des Dames, Paris	CD Philips 442 8960 (p)2007	A	5CD Decca 5346246 'Ivry Gitlis portrait' (p)2013
Franck, César		Violin Sonata in A major, M.8	Martha Argerich, piano	X.1976, Ricordi studio, Milano	LP Ricordi RCL-27018 (p)1976	A	CD RCA Red Seal BVCC-35110 (p)2001+2015
Debussy, Claude		Violin Sonata in G minor, L 140	Martha Argerich, piano	X.1976, Ricordi studio, Milano	LP Ricordi RCL-27018 (p)1976	A	CD RCA Red Seal BVCC-35110 (p)2001+2015
Ravel, Maurice		Pièce en forme de Habañera (Vocalise)	unknown, piano	31.X.1977, Paris	2CD+DVD Doremi DHR-7981-3 (p)2010	V	
Mendelssohn, Felix		Violin Concerto in E minor, Op.64	Orchestre National de l'Opéra de Monte-Carlo / David Josefowitz	13.VI.1978, Monte-Carlo	CD Doron 4013 (p)2012	A	
Sibelius, Jean		Violin Concerto in D minor, Op.47	Orchestre National de l'Opéra de Monte-Carlo / Antonio de Almeida	14.VI.1978, Monte-Carlo	CD Doron 4013 (p)2012	A	
Vivaldi, Antonio		Concerto for 4 violins in B minor, Op.3 No.10, RV 580 (from "L'estro Armonico")	Israel Philharmonic Orchestra / Ida Haendel, Isaac Stern, Shlomo Mintz / Zubin Mehta	13–19.XII.1982, Tel-Aviv	2LP DGG 2741 026	A + V	live, "The Huberman Week Festival, 30th Anniversary"
Bartók, Béla		Violin Concerto No.2, Sz.112, BB 117	Israel Philharmonic Orchestra / Zubin Mehta	13–19.XII.1982, Tel-Aviv	4CD Helicon 02-9667	A	live, "The Huberman Week Festival, 30th Anniversary"
Bernstein, Charles Harold		"Rhapsodie Israélienne", for Violin solo〈1984〉		1984	CD Arcobaleno 93922 (p)1996	A	
Bernstein, Charles Harold		"Romantic Suite", for Violin solo〈1984〉		1984	CD Arcobaleno 93922 (p)1996	A	
Cosma, Vladimir		“Concerto de Berlin” for violin and orchestra (from the film "Le Septième Cible" of Claude Pinoteau)	Berliner Philharmoniker / Vladimir Cosma	1984	CD Larghetto Music 004/8	A	soundtrack release (p)2009 / YouTube
Legrand, Michel		“Stanislas se souvient” (from the film "La Bûche" of Danièle Thompson)	Orchestra conducted by Michel Legrand	1980s	CD EmArcy Records 982908-1	A	'Le cinéma de Michel Legrand' (p)2005
Tchaikovsky, Pyotr Ilyich		Violin Concerto in D major, Op.35 (III. Finale. Allegro vivacissimo)	Orchestre Symphonique de Radio Tele Luxembourg / Leopold Hager	18.II.1985, Luxembourg	DVD Doremi DHR-7981-3 (p)2010	V	live
Sarasate, Pablo de		Zigeunerweisen (Gypsy Airs) Op.20	Orchestre Symphonique de Radio Tele Luxembourg / Leopold Hager	18.II-1985, Luxembourg	DVD Doremi DHR-7981-3 (p)2010	V	live
Saint-Saëns, Camille		Introduction et rondo capriccioso, Op.28	Orchestre Symphonique de Radio Tele Luxembourg / Leopold Hager	18.II.1985, Luxembourg	DVD Doremi DHR-7981-3 (p)2010	V	live
Beethoven, Ludwig van		Violin Sonata No.5 in F major, Op.24 “Spring” (III. Scherzo. Allegro molto)	Pierre Barbizet, piano	18.II.1985, Luxembourg	DVD Doremi DHR-7981-3 (p)2010	V	live
Brahms, Johannes		Violin Sonata No.3 in D minor, Op.108 (III. Un poco presto e con sentimento)	Pierre Barbizet, piano	18.II.1985, Luxembourg	DVD Doremi DHR-7981-3 (p)2010	V	live
Bach, Johann Sebastian	Wilhelmj, August	Air on G string (from Orchestral Suite No.3, BWV 1068)	Shigeo Neriki, piano	1985/5/8-11, Tokyo	CD: Toshiba EMI TOCE-9063/65	A	only in: 'Legendary Virtuoso', 3CD
Bazzini, Antonio		La Ronde des Lutins, scherzo fantastique Op.25	Shigeo Neriki, piano	1985/5/8-11, Tokyo	CD: Toshiba EMI TOCE-9063/65	A	only in: 'Legendary Virtuoso', 3CD
Bloch, Ernest		Nigun -Improvisation- (No.2 from "Baal Shem", Three Pictures of Chassidic Life)	Shigeo Neriki, piano	1985/5/8-11, Tokyo	CD: Toshiba EMI CC33-3308/3309	A	'The best of violin melodies', 2CD
Debussy, Claude	Hartmann, Arthur	La fille aux cheveux de lin	Shigeo Neriki, piano	1985/5/8-11, Tokyo	CD: Toshiba EMI CC33-3308/3309	A	'The best of violin melodies', 2CD
Dinicu, Grigoras	Heifetz, Jascha	Hora Staccato	Shigeo Neriki, piano	1985/5/8-11, Tokyo	CD: Toshiba EMI CC33-3308/3309	A	'The best of violin melodies', 2CD
Dvořák, Antonín	Kreisler, Fritz	Songs My Mother Taught Me, Op.55 No.4 (from "Gypsy Songs")	Shigeo Neriki, piano	1985/5/8-11, Tokyo	CD: Toshiba EMI CC33-3308/3309	A	'The best of violin melodies', 2CD
Dvořák, Antonín	Kreisler, Fritz	Humoresque in G-flat major, Op.101 No.7	Shigeo Neriki, piano	1985/5/8-11, Tokyo	CD: Toshiba EMI CC33-3308/3309	A	'The best of violin melodies', 2CD
Elgar, Edward		Salut d'amour, Op.12	Shigeo Neriki, piano	1985/5/8-11, Tokyo	CD: Toshiba EMI CC33-3308/3309	A	'The best of violin melodies', 2CD
Elgar, Edward		La Capricieuse, Op.17	Shigeo Neriki, piano	1985/5/8-11, Tokyo	CD: Toshiba EMI TOCE-9063/65	A	only in: 'Legendary Virtuoso', 3CD
Gabriel-Marie, Jean		La Cinquantaine, Air dans le style ancien / 'The Golden Wedding Anniversary' (No.2 from "2 Pieces", ca.1887)	Shigeo Neriki, piano	1985/5/8-11, Tokyo	CD: Toshiba EMI CC33-3308/3309	A	'The best of violin melodies', 2CD
Kreisler, Fritz		The Londonderry Air, 'Farewell to Cucullain' (old Irish melody)	Shigeo Neriki, piano	1985/5/8-11, Tokyo	CD: Toshiba EMI CC33-3308/3309	A	'The best of violin melodies', 2CD
Kreisler, Fritz		Liebesfreud (Alt-Wiener Tanzweisen, No.1)	Shigeo Neriki, piano	1985/5/8-11, Tokyo	CD: Toshiba EMI CC33-3308/3309	A	'The best of violin melodies', 2CD
Kreisler, Fritz		Liebesleid (Alt-Wiener Tanzweisen, No.2)	Shigeo Neriki, piano	1985/5/8-11, Tokyo	CD: Toshiba EMI CC33-3308/3309	A	'The best of violin melodies', 2CD
Kreisler, Fritz		Schön Rosmarin (Alt-Wiener Tanzweisen, No.3)	Shigeo Neriki, piano	1985/5/8-11, Tokyo	CD: Toshiba EMI CC33-3308/3309	A	'The best of violin melodies', 2CD
Kreisler, Fritz		Caprice Viennois, Op.2	Shigeo Neriki, piano	1985/5/8-11, Tokyo	CD: Toshiba EMI CC33-3308/3309	A	'The best of violin melodies', 2CD
Kreisler, Fritz		Rondino on a Theme of Beethoven -based on an unused theme by Beethoven, from the rejected final movement of the Wind Octet in E-flat major (1793), later used as theme in the Rondò for violin and piano in G major WoO 41-	Shigeo Neriki, piano	1985/5/8-11, Tokyo	CD: Toshiba EMI CC33-3308/3309	A	'The best of violin melodies', 2CD
Massenet, Jules	Marsick, Martin-Pierre	Méditation de Thaïs	Shigeo Neriki, piano	1985/5/8-11, Tokyo	CD: Toshiba EMI CC33-3308/3309	A	'The best of violin melodies', 2CD
Mendelssohn, Felix	Heifetz, Jascha	Auf Flügeln des Gesanges (On Wings of Song), Op.34 No.2	Shigeo Neriki, piano	1985/5/8-11, Tokyo	CD: Toshiba EMI CC33-3308/3309	A	'The best of violin melodies', 2CD
Paganini, Niccolò		Cantabile in D major, Op.17, MS 109	Shigeo Neriki, piano	1985/5/8-11, Tokyo	CD: Toshiba EMI CC33-3308/3309	A	'The best of violin melodies', 2CD
Paradis, Maria Teresa von	Dushkin, Samuel	Sicilienne	Shigeo Neriki, piano	1985/5/8-11, Tokyo	CD: Toshiba EMI CC33-3308/3309	A	'The best of violin melodies', 2CD
Poldini, Edward (Ede)	Kreisler, Fritz	Poupée valsante (d'après l'Album 'Marionnettes')	Shigeo Neriki, piano	1985/5/8-11, Tokyo	CD: Toshiba EMI CC33-3308/3309	A	'The best of violin melodies', 2CD
Rachmaninoff, Sergei	Kreisler, Fritz	Daisies (Marguerite), Op.38 No.3	Shigeo Neriki, piano	1985/5/8-11, Tokyo	CD: Toshiba EMI CC33-3308/3309	A	'The best of violin melodies', 2CD
Raff, Joachim		Cavatina, Op.85 No.3	Shigeo Neriki, piano	1985/5/8-11, Tokyo	CD: Toshiba EMI CC33-3308/3309	A	'The best of violin melodies', 2CD
Ravel, Maurice		Pièce en forme de Habañera (Vocalise)	Shigeo Neriki, piano	1985/5/8-11, Tokyo	CD: Toshiba EMI CC33-3308/3309	A	'The best of violin melodies', 2CD
Sarasate, Pablo de		Habanera, Op.21 No.2 (Spanish Dance No.2)	Shigeo Neriki, piano	1985/5/8-11, Tokyo	CD: Toshiba EMI TOCE-9063/65	A	only in: 'Legendary Virtuoso', 3CD
Sarasate, Pablo de		Zigeunerweisen (Gypsy Airs), Op.20	Shigeo Neriki, piano	1985/5/8-11, Tokyo	CD: Toshiba EMI CC33-3308/3309	A	'The best of violin melodies', 2CD
Moszkovski, Moritz	Sarasate, Pablo de	Guitarre, Op.45 No.2	Shigeo Neriki, piano	1985/5/8-11, Tokyo	CD: Toshiba EMI TOCE-9063/65	A	only in: 'Legendary Virtuoso', 3CD
Tchaikovsky, Pyotr Ilyich		Mélodie in E flat major, Op.42 No.3 (from "Souvenir d'un lieu cher")	Shigeo Neriki, piano	1985/5/8-11, Tokyo	CD: Toshiba EMI CC33-3308/3309	A	'The best of violin melodies', 2CD
Tchaikovsky, Pyotr Ilyich		Valse sentimentale in F minor, Op.51 No.6	Shigeo Neriki, piano	1985/5/8-11, Tokyo	CD: Toshiba EMI CC33-3308/3309	A	'The best of violin melodies', 2CD
Wieniawski, Henryk		Capriccio-Valse, Op.7	Shigeo Neriki, piano	1985/5/8-11, Tokyo	CD: Toshiba EMI CC33-3308/3309	A	'The best of violin melodies', 2CD
Massenet, Jules	Marsick, Martin-Pierre	Méditation de Thaïs	Yves Henry, piano	13.I.1988, Paris	DVD Doremi DHR-7981-3 (p)2010	V	live
Mendelssohn, Felix	Kreisler, Fritz	Romance sans paroles No.25 in G Major, Op.62 No.1 "Brise de Mai"	Shuku Iwasaki, piano	1989/6/14-15, Tokyo	CD: EMI 54774	A	'Extravaganza'
Sarasate, Pablo de	Heifetz, Jascha	Introduction et Tarantelle, Op.43	Shuku Iwasaki, piano	1989/6/14-15, Tokyo	CD: EMI 54774	A	'Extravaganza'
Kreisler, Fritz		Syncopation (1926)	Shuku Iwasaki, piano	1989/6/14-15, Tokyo	CD: EMI 54774	A	'Extravaganza'
Falla, Manuel de	Kochansky, Paul	Jota (No.6 from “Suite populaire espagnole”)	Shuku Iwasaki, piano	1989/6/14-15, Tokyo	CD: EMI 54774	A	'Extravaganza'
Glazunov, Alexander		Méditation, Op.32	Shuku Iwasaki, piano	1989/6/14-15, Tokyo	CD: EMI 54774	A	'Extravaganza'
Sarasate, Pablo de		Romanza andaluza, Op.22 No.1 (Spanish Dance No.3)	Shuku Iwasaki, piano	1989/6/14-15, Tokyo	CD: EMI 54774	A	'Extravaganza'
Kreisler, Fritz		Tambourin Chinois, Op.3 (1910)	Shuku Iwasaki, piano	1989/6/14-15, Tokyo	CD: EMI 54774	A	'Extravaganza'
Albéniz, Isaac	Kreisler, Fritz	Malagueña, Op.165 No.3 (from "España")	Shuku Iwasaki, piano	1989/6/14-15, Tokyo	CD: EMI 54774	A	'Extravaganza'
Brahms, Johannes	Joachim, Joseph	Hungarian dance No.1 in G minor, W.o.O. 1, Allegro molto	Shuku Iwasaki, piano	1989/6/14-15, Tokyo	CD: EMI 54774	A	'Extravaganza'
Falla, Manuel de	Kreisler, Fritz	Danse espagnole No.1 (from "La vida breve")	Shuku Iwasaki, piano	1989/6/14-15, Tokyo	CD: EMI 54774	A	'Extravaganza'
Tartini, Giuseppe	Kreisler, Fritz	Sonata in G minor, B.g5 “The Devil's Trill”	Shuku Iwasaki, piano	1989/6/14-15, Tokyo	CD: EMI 54774	A	'Extravaganza'
Chopin, Frédéric	Milstein, Nathan	Nocturne No.20 in C-sharp minor, Op.posth.	Shuku Iwasaki, piano	1989/6/14-15, Tokyo	CD: EMI 54774	A	'Extravaganza'
Bach, Johann Sebastian		Chaconne (from Partita No.2 in D minor, BWV 1004: V)		30.VI.1990, Tokyo	DVD Toshiba EMI 3527	V	live, Casals Hall Tokyo
Bartók, Béla		Sonata for solo Violin, Sz.117, BB 124		30.VI.1990, Tokyo	DVD Toshiba EMI 3527	V	live, Casals Hall Tokyo
Bach, Johann Sebastian		Fuga (from Sonata No.3 in C major, BWV 1005: II)		30.VI.1990, Tokyo	DVD Toshiba EMI 3527	V	live, Casals Hall Tokyo
Gitlis, Ivry		Improvisation – Impromptu “...for you, ...for Japan, ...for Music”		30.VI.1990, Tokyo	DVD Toshiba EMI 3527	V	live, Casals Hall Tokyo
Bach, Johann Sebastian		Gavotte en rondeau (from Partita No.3 in E major, BWV 1006: III)		30.VI.1990, Tokyo	DVD Toshiba EMI 3527	V	live, Casals Hall Tokyo
Berg, Alban		Violin Concerto “To the Memory of an Angel”	WDR Sinfonieorchester Köln / Hans Vonk	24.I.1992, Köln	DVD Doremi DHR-7981-3 (p)2010	V	live
Simonetti, Achille		Madrigale in D major (1901)	Shuku Iwasaki, piano	XII.1994 - I.1995, Tokyo	CD Philips 456 192–2	A	'Le violon enchanté'
Schumann, Robert	Kreisler, Fritz	Romance in A major, Op.94 No.2	Shuku Iwasaki, piano	XII.1994 - I.1995, Tokyo	CD Philips 456 192–2	A	'Le violon enchanté'
Kreisler, Fritz		Menuet “in the style of Porpora” (1910)	Shuku Iwasaki, piano	XII.1994 - I.1995, Tokyo	CD Philips 456 192–2	A	'Le violon enchanté'
Kreisler, Fritz		Marche Miniature Viennoise (1925)	Shuku Iwasaki, piano	XII.1994 - I.1995, Tokyo	CD Philips 456 192–2	A	'Le violon enchanté'
Tchaikovsky, Pyotr Ilyich		Andante cantabile (from String Quartet No.1 in D major, Op.11: II)	Shuku Iwasaki, piano	XII.1994 - I.1995, Tokyo	CD Philips 456 192–2	A	'Le violon enchanté'
Kreisler, Fritz		Chanson Louis XIII et Pavane in the style of Couperin (1910)	Shuku Iwasaki, piano	XII.1994 - I.1995, Tokyo	CD Philips 456 192–2	A	'Le violon enchanté'
Couperin, François	Bachmann, Alberto	Les Chérubins (from Suite XX, No.3)	Shuku Iwasaki, piano	XII.1994 - I.1995, Tokyo	CD Philips 456 192–2	A	'Le violon enchanté'
Handel, Georg Friederich		Violin Sonata in E major, Op.1 No.15, HWV 373 (doubtful)	Shuku Iwasaki, piano	XII.1994 - I.1995, Tokyo	CD Philips 456 192–2	A	'Le violon enchanté'
Fauré, Gabriel	Bachmann, Alberto	Après un rêve, Op.7 No.1	Shuku Iwasaki, piano	XII.1994 - I.1995, Tokyo	CD Philips 456 192–2	A	'Le violon enchanté'
Fauré, Gabriel		Berceuse, Op.16	Shuku Iwasaki, piano	XII.1994 - I.1995, Tokyo	CD Philips 456 192–2	A	'Le violon enchanté'
Chaminade, Cécile	Kreisler, Fritz	Sérénade espagnole, Op.150	Shuku Iwasaki, piano	XII.1994 - I.1995, Tokyo	CD Philips 456 192–2	A	'Le violon enchanté'
Fibich, Zdeněk	Kubelik, Jan / Gitlis, Ivry	Poème, Op.41 No.6	Shuku Iwasaki, piano	XII.1994 - I.1995, Tokyo	CD Philips 456 192–2	A	'Le violon enchanté'
Dawes, Charles Gates	Kreisler, Fritz	Melody in A major (1912)	Shuku Iwasaki, piano	XII.1994 - I.1995, Tokyo	CD Philips 456 192–2	A	'Le violon enchanté'
Bartók, Béla	Székely, Zoltán	(6) Danses populaires roumaines, Sz.56, BB 58	Shuku Iwasaki, piano	XII.1994 - I.1995, Tokyo	CD Philips 456 192–2	A	'Le violon enchanté'
Brahms, Johannes		Violin Sonata No.3 in D minor, Op.108	Ana-Maria Vera, piano	10–12.XII.1996, Japan	CD Voicelle VXD-AH-971120	A	JP release
Beethoven, Ludwig van		Violin Sonata No.9 in A major, Op.47 “à Kreutzer”	Ana-Maria Vera, piano	10–12.XII.1996, Japan	CD Voicelle VXD-AH-971120	A	JP release
Hindemith, Paul		Violin Sonata No.1 in E-flat major, Op.11/1	Ana-Maria Vera, piano	10–12.XII.1996, Japan	CD Voicelle VXD-AH-971120	A	JP release
Franck, César		Violin Sonata in A major, M.8	Martha Argerich, piano	28.XI.1998, Japan	CD EMI TOCE-55260	A	live, "Beppu Argerich Festival" / JP release
Beethoven, Ludwig van		Violin Sonata No.9 in A major, Op.47 “à Kreutzer”	Martha Argerich, piano	20.XI.1999, Japan	CD EMI TOCE-55260	A	live, "Beppu Argerich Festival" / JP release

=== Filmography ===
original title	year	director / producer	collaborating artists	Gitlis role / content	genre	info and note
Mendelssohn, Felix	1963/06/23	"Discorama" / Philippe Ducrest	Pro Musica Symphony Vienna (Wiener Symphoniker) / Hans Swarowsky	Violin Concerto in E minor, Op.64 (I. Allegro molto appassionato)	TV footage, archive by Meloclassic	1963 video playback over the 1954 VOX audio rec. / video YouTube
Ivry Gitlis – Musica da Camera	1963, Milano	Elisa Quattrocolo (RAI)	Loredana Franceschini, piano	Debussy, Violin Sonata / Paganini, Cantabile Op.17 / Wieniawski, Capriccio-Valse Op.7 / Moszkowski/arr. Sarasate, Guitarre	TV broadcast [T.T. 23'35"]	RAI5 Classica / YouTube
Ivry Gitlis – interview + Paganini	1965/01/10, Paris	Jacqueline Barsac (RTF, "JT 13 heures")	unknown orchestra and conductor	interview + rehearsal Paganini/Wilhelmj Violin Concerto Nr.1 in D major, Op.6 (fragment)	TV footage, archive by Meloclassic	YouTube
Ivry Gitlis – Journal de Paris (ina.fr)	1966/10/11, Paris	Jacqueline Barsac	Yves Henry, piano	rehearsal Paganini Caprice No.24 / Brahms Violin Sonata No.3, Op.108 + interview	TV footage	ina.fr, watch video
Ivry Gitlis – "Un violon, une valise"	1968/10/06, Paris	Jacques Busnel (ina.fr)	Girolamo Arrigo (composer)	rehearsing Saint-Saëns Violin Concerto No.2 Op.58, at his home in Paris + interview	TV footage	ina.fr, watch video / YouTube
The Rolling Stones Rock and Roll Circus: Whole Lotta Yoko	1968	Rolling Stones	John Lennon, Yoko Ono	violin solo improvisations	filmed concert	watch video / DVD release, 1996
Ivry Gitlis – avec les Tziganes	1970s			improvisations in gypsy style	TV footage, archive by Meloclassic	YouTube
Ivry Gitlis plays Bach (ina.fr)	1970s			Bach – Partita No.3 in E major, BWV 1006 (III. Gavotte en rondeau)	TV footage	dailymotion, watch video
Ivry Gitlis – "Sur le vif, ou un violon dans la ville"	1971, Paris	M.Philippe-Gérard / Edmond Tyborowsky	avec : Ivry Gitlis / violon off : Stéphane Grappelli	musique de : M.Philippe-Gérard / ingenieurs du son : Guy Solignac, Claude Bittan / assistés de : Edouard Hoffmann, Hervé Chauvel / directeur de la photographie: Henri Martin / cadreurs : Guy Maçon, Adrien Ballester, Bernard Gapail / montage : Jean-Claude Couprie / assisté de : Yves Charoy / scripts-girls : Andrée Gautey, Christiane Barreau / décorateur : Armand Braun / mixage : Jean-Paul Quiquempois / collaborateur artistique : Didier Philippe-Gérard / assistants-réalisateur : Toni Tounsi, Jeanne Barbillon, Xavier Guilhem-Ducléon / réalisation : Edmond Tyborowsky / Date de diffusion : 21/03/1971 / Durée : 00h 47' 35"	TV film, archive by Meloclassic	YouTube
Ivry Gitlis – Vence Music Festival	1972, Vence		Georges Cziffra, Dizzy Gillespie, Georges Moustaki, François-René Duchable, Zubin Mehta	Chopin – Fantasie Impromptu Op.66 (G.Cziffra) / Bach – Chaconne BWV 1004 (I.Gitlis) / jam sessions (I.Gitlis & D.Gillespie & G.Moustaki) / Z.Mehta, conducting string orchestra / Schubert – fragments "Trout Quintet" (I.Gitlis, Z.Mehta, F.-R.Duchable, & friends)	TV footage, archive by Meloclassic	YouTube
Ivry Gitlis – an ambassador for Children, Young People and Music	1973, Vence			explaining music to children / Beethoven – Violin Concerto Op.61 (fragments)	TV footage, archive by Meloclassic	YouTube
Ivry Gitlis with Barbara	1974, Paris			Gitlis improvising the violin part in "Une petite cantate" with Barbara	TV footage	YouTube
Ivry Gitlis with Léo Ferré	1974, Paris			Gitlis improvising the violin part in the song "Les Étrangers"	TV footage, archive by Meloclassic	YouTube
Ivry Gitlis with Michel Legrand	1974, Paris			Gitlis with Michel Legrand and his orchestra, playing compositions for the movies "Summer of '42" (1971) and "The Thomas Crown Affair" (1968)	TV footage, archive by Meloclassic	YouTube
Jean Arp ou le nageur énigmatique (ina.fr)	1975/5/17, Paris	Georges Alain Baudry (Antenne 2)	Ivry Gitlis, violin / Schola Cantorum / Jean Arp		TV footage	ina.fr, watch video
L'Histoire d'Adèle H.	1975	François Truffaut	Isabelle Adjani, Bruce Robinson	The Hypnotist	film-drama	IMDb
Ivry Gitlis – Musique en fête (ina.fr)	1977/9/01, Bordeaux	Jacques Schreiber (France Region 3)		Improvisation workshop with children	TV footage	ina.fr, watch video
La vie devant soi	1977	Moshé Mizrahi	Simone Signoret, Michal Bat-Adam	violin solo	film-drama	IMDb
Ivry Gitlis – "Les violons qui miaulent" (ina.fr)	1979/11/24, Paris	Pierre Leherle (TF1)			TV footage	ina.fr, watch video / YouTube
Ivry Gitlis – Les mystères de l'hérédité (ina.fr)	1979/12/10, Paris	Jean Archimbaud (TF1)	Pierre Paul Grasse, André Langaney, Jean Didier Vincent, Jacques Mehler		TV footage	ina.fr, watch video
Ivry Gitlis – Ecole maternelle, musique (ina.fr)	1981/1/28, Paris	Martine Chardon (Antenne 2)			TV footage	ina.fr, watch video
Les Enquêtes du commissaire Maigret	1981		Jean Richard	episode: "Maigret et l'homme tout seul" / René Vivien (a violin-playing tramp)	TV fiction	Télévision Française, 1982
Festival de musique de Bonifacio (ina.fr)	1984/9/06, Bonifacio	Pierre Jean Luccioni (France 3 Corse)			TV footage	ina.fr, watch video
Un amour de Swann	1984	Volker Schlöndorff	Jeremy Irons, Ornella Muti	violinist	film-drama	IMDb
La Septième Cible	1984		Vladimir Cosma, soundtrack	"Berlin Concerto" from the French film "La Septième cible" at Berliner Philharmoniker played by Gitlis	film-drama	IMDb / watch video
Ivry Gitlis – Journal de Paris (ina.fr)	1987/1/01, Paris	André Halimi (Editing Prod.)			TV footage	ina.fr, watch video
Ivry Gitlis – "hommage à Jascha Heifetz"	1988/1/13, Paris	broadcast "Le Grand Échiquier" – Vive la rentrée, by André Flédérick		Ivry Gitlis – "hommage à Jascha Heifetz" († 10.XII.1987) + Jules MASSENET: Méditation de Thaïs (Yves Henry, piano)	TV footage, archive by Meloclassic	YouTube
Léo Ferré, 'Les Etrangers' (ina.fr)	1988/4/23, Paris	Michel Drucker (France 2)			TV footage	ina.fr, watch video
Ivry Gitlis – Afrique (ina.fr)	1990/05/15	Arnaud Hamelin, Jean Pierre Van Geirt (Sunset)			TV footage	ina.fr, watch video
Un violon dans la tête	1992	Claude Edelmann (Arte video)	I.Gitlis & Vinh Pham	music and neurosciences	scientific documentary	Institut français / VHS PAL only
The Soul of The Violin	1993	André Delacroix (France 3)	Pierre Amoyal, Patrice Fontanarosa, Ivry Gitlis, Sergei Krilov, Hugh Maguire, Yehudi Menuhin, Anne-Sophie Mutter		documentary	medici.tv, medici.tv
Ivry Gitlis & Ana-Maria Vera – recital	1999	Yvon Gérault (Qualite Communication, 2000)	Ana-Maria Vera, piano	Concert recorded at the Abbaye Saint-Léonard de Corbigny (Nièvre): Mozart – Violin Sonata K.301 / Chopin – Fantaisie-Impromptu Op.66 (piano solo) / Bloch – Nigun (No.2 from "Baal Shem") / Sarasate – Zigeunerweisen Op.20 / Kreisler – Liebesleid / Beethoven – Violin Sonata No.9 Op.47 "Kreutzer"	filmed concert	MEZZO.tv (broadcast, 2004/2/19) / YouTube
Beppu! 2001	2001		feat.: Akane Sakai, Geza Hosszu-Legocky, Martha Argerich, Ivry Gitlis, Nelson Freire, Antonio Pappano	A film for insiders	TV footage, archive by Meloclassic	YouTube
The Art of Violin	2001	Bruno Monsaingeon	Itzhak Perlman	I.Gitlis (commentator/performer) / Part 1. "The Devil's Instrument" & Part 2. "Transcending the Violin"	documentary	DVD release, 2010 / YouTube
Sansa	2003	Siegfried	Roschdy Zem, Emma Suarez, Martha Argerich	I.Gitlis (Monsieur Click)	film-drama	IMDb / YouTube
Ivry Gitlis, documentary	2003	Robertie Nahoum Valee	Australia Chamber Orchestra / Richard Tognetti	Beethoven – Sonata "Kreutzer" / Saint-Saëns – Introduction and rondo capriccioso Op.28 (arranged by R.Tognetti for violin and string orchestra) + interview	filmed concert	Ivry Gitlis / short clip on YouTube
Ivry Gitlis and the Great Tradition	2004	Tony Palmer		performer	documentary	DVD release, 2012 / YouTube
Ruggiero Ricci – Life is a Violin	2006	Fernando Casablancas (Xochil Prod.)	Ruggiero Ricci, Ivry Gitlis	Ricci at his home in Palm Springs, in Paris with fellow fiddler Ivry Gitlis, and in Mozarteum Salzburg for a master class. A personal portrait of a great artist and warm and endearing man.	documentary	medici.tv / YouTube
Inspiration, Playing by Heart	2009	Marlies Huitink, Fried-jan van den Eerenbeemt	David Stern, Daniel Rowland, Anna Korpalska, Jaap van Zweden, 't Stift Weerselo, Kim Cramer, Pete Saunders, Peter Ziegler	himself	documentary	Crossmarkpictures, Avro / YouTube
Ivry Gitlis & Michel Legrand	2009	Tandem (France 2)		Ivry Gitlis and Michel Legrand, playing a joke, imitating 'Contemporary Music'	TV footage	dailymotion, watch video
Ivry Gitlis, le violon sans frontières	2009	Sandra Joxe, Christian Labrande		performer	documentary	Classifilms, Arte, ina / DVD, 2010 / YouTube
Ivry Gitlis, improvisation	2009/10/18		Brigitte Engerer, Boris Berezovsky	recorded during Pianoscope à Beauvais – Festival 2009 – improvisation sur le nom 'Brigitte' (Ivry Gitlis, violin – Boris Berezovsky, piano)	private recording	dailymotion, watch video
Ivry Gitlis, interview – wallcast #13	2011/7/27, Verbier	Matthieu Escande (MUSEEC/medici.tv)		Verbier Festival	documentary	medici.tv, watch video / YouTube
Legends Interview Series – Ivry Gitlis	2011/12/17, London	Steven Isserlis, Josè Lasheras	Steven Isserlis, interviewer / Stephen Hough, piano	Interview at Wigmore Hall, London + concert with piano (Paradis – Sicilienne / Kreisler – Liebesleid)	documentary	YouTube
Ivry Gitlis – Un violon pour la paix dans le monde	2012/04/02	Patrick Simonin (L'Invité, TV5Monde)			TV interview	dailymotion, watch video
Masterclass with Ivry Gitlis	2012, Thessaloniki	Angela Maria Arbeláez, Thanasis Protatos		Institut Français de Thessalonique	documentary	YouTube, watch video
Des gens qui s'embrassent	2013	Danièle Thompson	Monica Bellucci	Aron (the patriarch of a Jewish family)	film-comedy	IMDb / watch film / YouTube
Des gens qui s'embrassent	2013/04/5		Ivry Gitlis & Monica Bellucci	L'invité du jour du 05/04/2013 dans 'A La Bonne Heure'	interview	dailymotion, watch video / YouTube
Ivry Gitlis – Legendary Violin Recital in 2013	2013/6/14, Tokyo	Nakamura Toshitake (Tempo Primo, Japan)	Vahan Mardirossian, piano	Händel – Sonata in E major Op.1 No.15, HWV 373 / Franck – Violin Sonata in A major / Brahms – Scherzo F.A.E. / Bloch – Nigun / Kreisler – Liebesleid, Syncopation, Schön Rosmarin / Massenet – Meditation de Thais / Paradis – Sicilienne / Narita – The Song of the Seashore / Paganini – Cantabile Op.17	filmed concert	DVD Tempo Primo Co., Ltd., 2015
Ivry Gitlis – La matinale	2013/11/02	Jean Michel Dhuez (France Musique)		"Jean Michel Dhuez reçoit l'invité du jour le célèbre violoniste Ivry Gitlis dont l'autobiographie "L'âme et la corde" paraît dans une nouvelle édition augmentée aux éditions Buchet/Chastel."	TV interview	dailymotion, watch video
