= The Rolling Stones Rock and Roll Circus =

- Directed by: Michael Lindsay-Hogg
- Produced by: Sanford Lieberson
- Starring: The Rolling Stones; Jethro Tull; The Who; Taj Mahal; Marianne Faithfull; The Dirty Mac; Yoko Ono; Robert Fossett's Circus; The Nurses
- Cinematography: Anthony B. Richmond
- Edited by: Ruth Foster; Robin Klein
- Production company: BBC
- Distributed by: ABKCO Films
- Release date: 12 October 1996 (New York Film Festival)
- Running time: 66 minutes
- Country: United Kingdom
- Language: English

The Rolling Stones Rock and Roll Circus is a British concert film hosted by and featuring the Rolling Stones, filmed on 11–12 December 1968. It was directed by Michael Lindsay-Hogg, who proposed the idea of a "rock and roll circus" to Jagger. The show was filmed on a makeshift circus stage with Jethro Tull, the Who, Taj Mahal, Marianne Faithfull, and the Rolling Stones. John Lennon and his fiancee Yoko Ono performed as part of a one-shot supergroup called the Dirty Mac, featuring Eric Clapton on guitar, Mitch Mitchell (of the Jimi Hendrix Experience) on drums, and the Stones' Keith Richards on bass. The recently formed Led Zeppelin had been considered for inclusion, but the idea was rejected. (As the Who's Pete Townshend recalled, an earlier idea for a circus-themed concert tour had been floated; it would have featured the Stones, the Who, and the Small Faces.)

The film was meant to be aired on the BBC, but the Rolling Stones withheld it, contending that they did so because they felt their performance was substandard; they were clearly exhausted after 15 hours of filming (and some indulgence in drugs). It was Brian Jones' last appearance with the Rolling Stones; he drowned some seven months later while the film was being edited. Some speculate that another reason for not releasing the film was that the Who, who were fresh off a concert tour, upstaged the Stones on their own production. The show was not released commercially until October 1996.

== Concept and performance ==
The project was conceived by Mick Jagger as a way to promote the Stones' album Beggars Banquet beside conventional press and concert appearances. Jagger approached Lindsay-Hogg, who had directed promos for two Rolling Stones songs in 1968, and would go on to direct the Beatles' Let It Be documentary, to make a full-length TV show for them. According to Lindsay-Hogg, the idea of combining rock music and a circus setting came to him when he was trying to come up with ideas; he drew a circle on a piece of paper and free-associated.

The Rolling Stones and their guests performed in a replica of a seedy big top on a British sound stage—the Intertel (V.T.R. Services) Studio, Wycombe Road, Wembley—in front of an invited audience. The performances began at around 2 pm on 11 December 1968, but setting up between acts and reloading cameras took longer than planned, which meant that the final performances took place at almost 5 o'clock in the morning on the 12th.

By that time the audience and most of the Rolling Stones were exhausted. It was only due to Jagger's sheer enthusiasm and stamina, and Lindsay-Hogg's patience and encouragement, that they kept going until the end. Regardless, Jagger was reportedly so disappointed with his and the band's performance that he cancelled the airing of the film, and kept it from public view. Pete Townshend recalled:

When they really get moving, there is a kind of white magic that starts to replace the black magic, and everything starts to really fly. That didn't happen on this occasion; there's no question about that. They weren't just usurped by The Who, they were also usurped by Taj Mahal – who was just, as always, extraordinary. They were usurped to some extent by the event itself: the crowd by the time the Stones went on were radically festive.

Lindsay-Hogg recalled that the Stones' Brian Jones had phoned him the night before the scheduled filming in order to inform the director that he would not be participating in the film. "I hate the Rolling Stones," Jones told him. Lindsay-Hogg spoke with Jones for about twenty minutes and convinced him to come to the filming. It would prove to be Jones's final public performance with the Rolling Stones. For much of the Stones' set he is very low in the mix, although audio exists in which his guitar is much higher. His slide guitar on "No Expectations", maracas on "Sympathy for the Devil", and rhythm guitar on "Jumpin' Jack Flash" remain clear. Ian Anderson remarked:

Brian Jones was well past his sell-by date by then… We spoke to Brian and he didn't really know what was going on. He was rather cut off from the others – there was a lot of embarrassed silence. But a delightful chap, and we felt rather sorry for him… I was approached for an interview by a chap from Record Mirror… I inadvertently remarked that the Stones were a bit under-rehearsed and that Brian couldn't even tune his guitar, which was literally the truth but a bit tactless and inappropriate for me to say. This was duly reported, whereupon Mick Jagger was mightily upset. I had to send a grovelling apology to his office.

As well as marking the last live performance of Brian Jones with the band, it also marked the first time that long term collaborator Nicky Hopkins performed live with them, having contributed extensively to the Beggars Banquet sessions. The last song, "Salt of the Earth", was sung live by Keith Richards and Mick Jagger to the pre-recorded tape from the studio album on which the song had been released.

According to Bill Wyman's book, Rolling with the Stones, the Rolling Stones also performed "Confessing the Blues", "Route 66" and an alternative take of "Sympathy for the Devil" with Brian Jones on guitar.

Of the Dirty Mac's one-song, one-off performance, the journalist David Dalton, who attended the filming, wrote in Rolling Stone magazine in 1970, "Simply the presence of all these magicians together is completely overwhelming." After the group's performance of Lennon's "Yer Blues," which segued into an extended, avant-garde jam featuring Ono's wailing, Dalton described the audience as "totally awestruck; they do not move or talk. It was breathtaking."

== Performers ==
- Sir Robert Fossett's Circus
  - Norman McGlen – dwarf
  - Willie Shearer – dwarf
  - Milton Reid – strongman
- Jethro Tull
  - Ian Anderson – flute and vocals (recorded live)
  - Glenn Cornick – bass guitar and harmonica (mimed)
  - Tony Iommi – guitar (mimed)
  - Clive Bunker – drums (mimed)
- The Who
  - Roger Daltrey – vocals
  - Pete Townshend – guitar and vocals
  - John Entwistle – bass guitar and vocals
  - Keith Moon – drums and vocals
- Taj Mahal – harmonica and vocals
  - Jesse Ed Davis – guitar
  - Gary Gilmore – bass guitar
  - Chuck Blackwell – drums
- Marianne Faithfull – vocals
  - backed by pre-recorded instrumental tracks
- Danny Kamara – fire-eater
  - Donyale Luna – assistant
- The Dirty Mac
  - John Lennon – guitar and vocals
  - Eric Clapton – guitar
  - Keith Richards – bass guitar
  - Mitch Mitchell – drums
  - Ivry Gitlis – violin
  - Yoko Ono – vocals
- The Rolling Stones
  - Mick Jagger – vocals, harmonica (on Parachute Woman)
  - Keith Richards – guitar, vocals (on Salt of the Earth)
  - Brian Jones – guitar, slide guitar (on No Expectations), maracas (on Sympathy for the Devil)
  - Bill Wyman – bass guitar
  - Charlie Watts – drums
  - Nicky Hopkins – piano
  - Kwasi Rocky Dzidzornu – percussion
  - Julius Katchen – piano (bonus tracks only)

== Footage ==
The project was abandoned until Lindsay-Hogg attempted to edit the film in 1992 but, due to missing principal footage, the project was put on hold. Some of the footage of the concert was thought to be lost or destroyed until 1993, when it was discovered in a bin in the Who's private film vault by the director/producer team Michael Gochanour and Robin Klein. Subsequent to their discovery, Gochanour and Klein completed the unfinished film in autumn 1996.

A significant segment, of the Who performing "A Quick One", had been shown theatrically in the documentary The Kids Are Alright (1979), the only public viewing of the film until its eventual release. The full movie was restored, edited, and finally released on CD and video in 1996. Included on the recordings are the introductions for each act, including some entertaining banter between Jagger and Lennon.

This concert is the only footage of Black Sabbath guitarist Tony Iommi performing as a member of Jethro Tull, during his brief two-week tenure as a replacement for Mick Abrahams. Coincidentally this is also the first live footage of Jethro Tull ever made; no footage of the original line-up with Abrahams (December 1967 – December 1968) is known to exist. The band mimed to the album version of "A Song for Jeffrey" and "Fat Man," so the guitar heard is actually Abrahams, and not Iommi, who may not have known his part sufficiently after only a few days in the band. The Rolling Stones forced them to cut their rehearsal time short, although Ian Anderson sings and plays flute live on "A Song For Jeffrey." "Fat Man" never made the final release, although it is not unreasonable to assume he also sang that live, as the released version (which appears on Stand Up) was not recorded until four months later. Finally, the footage shows Ian Anderson's first clumsy attempts at his now famous flute-playing position of standing on one leg.

== Reception ==
In a 1996 review, Janet Maslin lauded the "sleek young Stones in all their insolent glory presiding over this uneven but ripely nostalgic show"; although "rumor had it that the Stones... thought they looked tired and felt upstaged by the high-energy Who," "it hardly looks that way as Mick Jagger's fabulous performance nearly turns this into a one-man show." She called Jethro Tull's performance a "shaky start" by "arguably the most unbearable band of their day," said the Who "turn up early and stop traffic, delivering a fiery performance," and notes Yoko Ono's "glass-shattering shrieks" are "dutifully" backed by the Dirty Mac. She calls the concert-ending sing-along of "Salt of the Earth" smug and condescending, a "song about little people living in the real world."

== Theatrical releases ==
October 1996

The film was premiered on 12 October 1996 at the Walter Reade Theater as part of the New York Film Festival.

April 2019

In March 2019, it was announced that the film would be receiving a limited theatrical release in Dolby Cinema in early April, as the first concert film was due to be remastered with Dolby's Atmos and Vision, in conjunction with what was still then the ongoing North American leg of the Rolling Stones' No Filter Tour (before it was later postponed). Indeed, a limited U.S. remastered theatrical release of the film ran during the first week of April 2019.

== Home media ==
The Rolling Stones Rock and Roll Circus was released in October 1996 on VHS and laserdisc following two days of screenings at the Walter Reade Theater as part of the New York Film Festival.

A DVD version, produced by Gochanour and Klein, was released in October 2004, with audio remixed into Dolby Surround by Gochanour and co-producer Klein. The DVD includes footage of the show, along with extra features directed by Gochanour and Klein, which include previously "lost" performances, an interview with Pete Townshend, and three audio commentaries. Of particular interest in the Townshend interview is his description of the genesis of the Circus project, which he claims was initially meant to involve the performers travelling across the United States via train (a concept used for a short concert series in Canada that was later documented in the feature film Festival Express). The remastered DVD also includes a special four-camera view of the Dirty Mac's performance of the Beatles' "Yer Blues" (showing Yoko Ono kneeling on the floor in front of the musicians, completely covered in a black sheet).

== DVD track listing ==
1. David Dalton's written historic introduction (0:33)
2. "Entry of the Gladiators" (Julius Fučík) – Orchestra/
  The Rolling Stones Rock and Roll Circus Parade /
  Mick Jagger's introduction of Rock and Roll Circus (2:10)
3. Mick Jagger's introduction of Jethro Tull /
  "Song for Jeffrey" (Ian Anderson) – Jethro Tull (3:43)
4. Keith Richards's introduction of The Who /
  "A Quick One While He's Away" (Pete Townshend) – The Who (7:40)
5. "Over the Waves" (Juventino Rosas) – Orchestra (1:20)
6. "Ain't That a Lot of Love" (Willia Dean "Deanie" Parker, Homer Banks) – Taj Mahal (3:52)
7. Charlie Watts' introduction of Marianne Faithfull /
  "Something Better" (Barry Mann, Gerry Goffin) – Marianne Faithfull (2:37)
8. Keith Richards's introduction of Danny Camara /
  "Fire Eater and Luna (Donyale Luna)" (1:28)
9. Mick Jagger and John Lennon's introduction of The Dirty Mac (1:05)
10. "Yer Blues" (John Lennon, Paul McCartney) – The Dirty Mac (4:26)
11. "Whole Lotta Yoko" (Yoko Ono) – Yoko Ono, Ivry Gitlis, The Dirty Mac (5:03)
12. John Lennon's introduction of The Rolling Stones/
  "Jumping Jack Flash" (Mick Jagger, Keith Richards) – The Rolling Stones (3:38)
13. "Parachute Woman" (Jagger, Richards) – The Rolling Stones (2:57)
14. "No Expectations" (Jagger, Richards) – The Rolling Stones (4:07)
15. "You Can't Always Get What You Want" (Jagger, Richards) – The Rolling Stones (4:27)
16. "Sympathy for the Devil" (Jagger, Richards) – The Rolling Stones (8:52)
17. "Salt of the Earth" (Jagger, Richards) – The Rolling Stones (4:56)
18. Credits, to the sound of "Salt of the Earth" (2:45)

== Sideshows (DVD extras) ==
- Interview – Pete Townshend (18:26)
- "Checkin' Up on My Baby" (Sonny Boy Williamson) – Taj Mahal (5:39)
- "Leaving Trunk" (Sleepy John Estes) – Taj Mahal (6:28)
- "Corinna" (Taj Mahal, Jesse Ed Davis) – Taj Mahal (3:51)
- Brian Jones' introduction of Julius Katchen /
  "Ritual Fire Dance" – Julius Katchen (4:21)
- "Sonata in C 1st Movement" – Julius Katchen (2:11)
- "Yer Blues" TK2 Quad Split – The Dirty Mac (4:35)
- Bill Wyman's introduction of The Clowns /
  "The Clowns" (2:01)
- "Close, But No Cigar" – John Lennon and Mick Jagger (0:43)
- "Sympathy for the Devil" (Fatboy Slim Remix Video) – The Rolling Stones (4:29)
