= Yer Blues =

- Cover of the Maclen Music sheet music

Song by the Beatles

from the album The Beatles
- Released: 22 November 1968
- Recorded: 13, 14, 20 August 1968
- Studio: EMI, London
- Genre: Blues rock; hard rock
- Length: 4:01 (stereo); 4:16 (mono)
- Label: Apple
- Songwriter: Lennon–McCartney
- Producer: George Martin

"Yer Blues" is a song by the English rock band the Beatles, from their 1968 double album The Beatles. Though credited to Lennon–McCartney, the song was written and composed by John Lennon during the Beatles' retreat in Rishikesh, India. The song is a parody of blues music, specifically English imitators of blues.

== Composition ==
Lennon said that, while "trying to reach God and feeling suicidal" in India, he wanted to write a blues song, but was unsure if he could imitate the likes of Sleepy John Estes and other original blues artists he had listened to in school. In "Yer Blues," he alludes to this insecurity with a reference to the character Mr. Jones from Bob Dylan's "Ballad of a Thin Man," and with the third verse, which draws on Robert Johnson's "Hellhound on My Trail". Instead, Lennon wrote and composed "Yer Blues" as a parody of British imitators of the blues, featuring tongue-in-cheek guitar solos and rock and roll-inspired swing blues passages.

The half-satirical, half-earnest song mockingly acknowledges the British blues boom of 1968 and the debate among the music press at the time of whether white men could sing the blues. According to Walter Everett, the song's "ponderous earnestness ... belies the composer's satirical tone." In the chorus, Lennon sings, "If I ain't dead already, girl you know the reason why." Beatles biographer Jonathan Gould interprets this to be a "joke [in] that nobody knows the reason why—or, for that matter, what any of these bluesy poetics are really supposed to mean." Gould called "Yer Blues" an example of the "cultural realism" that distinguished the Beatles from their musical contemporaries in Britain: "[T]heir acceptance of the idea that, except as a subject of self-parody, certain expressive modes of African-American music lay outside the realm of their experience and hence beyond their emotional range as singers."

The song is in the key of E major, but like many blues numbers, it prominently features accidentals, such as G♮, D♮, and B♭. It is primarily in a 12/8 meter, but as with several of Lennon's tunes, the time signature and tempo are altered many times.

== Recording ==
"Yer Blues" was recorded in EMI Studio Two's "annexe," which was actually a large closet in the control room. In 2016, Paul McCartney recalled, "We were talking about this tightness, this packed-in-a-tin thing. So we got in a little cupboard – a closet that had microphone leads and things, with a drum kit, amps turned to the walls, one mic for John. We did 'Yer Blues' live and it was really good." In interviews for The Beatles Anthology series, Ringo Starr affectionately recalls recording this song in the stripped-down conditions, saying it was like the old days of live performances by the Beatles. The stripped-down, bluesy nature of the number bears similarity to much of Lennon's early solo output, including "Cold Turkey" and his 1970 John Lennon/Plastic Ono Band album and marks a retreat from the concerns that Lennon had with such studio experimentation as had marked songs like "Tomorrow Never Knows" and "Strawberry Fields Forever." The track, along with "Glass Onion", "While My Guitar Gently Weeps", "Mean Mr. Mustard" and "Sun King", is one of few Beatles songs on which Paul McCartney used a 1966 Fender Jazz Bass rather than his better-known 1963 Höfner 500/1 Violin Bass or his 1964 Rickenbacker 4001S-LH (Fire-glo) bass. Contributing to the live sound of the recording, loud yelling between band members can be heard in the instrumental tracks.

== Live performance ==
Just after The Beatles was released in late 1968, Lennon performed a rendition of "Yer Blues" at The Rolling Stones Rock and Roll Circus with a supergroup dubbed "The Dirty Mac," consisting of himself, Eric Clapton on lead guitar, Keith Richards on bass, and Mitch Mitchell of the Jimi Hendrix Experience on drums. The performance was followed with a boogie instrumental jam called "Whole Lotta Yoko," featuring dissonant avant-garde violinist Ivry Gitlis and vocals by Yoko Ono. The recording was never originally broadcast, and for decades this performance was only available through bootleg recording. It was finally officially released, on both CD and video, in 1996. Lennon's performance with the Dirty Mac was his first live performance since the Beatles' last concert in 1966 and may have contributed to his renewed enthusiasm for live performances in 1969. (See The Beatles' rooftop concert, "Give Peace a Chance" and Live Peace in Toronto.)

== Legacy ==
Coinciding with the 50th anniversary of its release, Jacob Stolworthy of The Independent listed "Yer Blues" at number eight in his ranking of the White Album's 30 tracks. He wrote of the song: "This track sees Lennon take on the blues to deliver a song that stands tall among the greats he attempted to emulate (see: Sleepy John Estes, John Lee Hooker). The result is evidence that Lennon rarely did wrong – even when he himself half expected to."

== Personnel ==
- John Lennon – lead vocals, electric guitar, first guitar solo
- Paul McCartney – backing vocals, bass
- George Harrison – electric guitar, second guitar solo
- Ringo Starr – drums

Personnel per Ian MacDonald

== Cover versions ==
- The Dirty Mac, on the TV special The Rolling Stones Rock and Roll Circus.
- Phish, on the album Live Phish Volume 13.
- Ringo Sheena, on the album Utaite Myōri: Sono Ichi.
