= Parachute Woman =

Song by the Rolling Stones

from the album Beggars Banquet
- Released: 6 December 1968
- Recorded: April 1968
- Genre: Blues
- Length: 2:23
- Label: ABKCO
- Songwriter: Jagger/Richards
- Producer: Jimmy Miller

"Parachute Woman" is a song by the Rolling Stones featured on their 1968 album Beggars Banquet.

== Inspiration and recording ==
Written by Mick Jagger and Keith Richards, "Parachute Woman" is a blues song and is one of the Beggars Banquet songs recorded on a cassette player and double-tracked for effect. Bill Janovitz comments in his review of the song:

The result is a raw and murky but atmosphere-filled blues track that spotlights Mick Jagger's mumbled sexual boasts and intense harmonica playing. With barely veiled innuendo – just enough to make it comical – Jagger makes like a modern-day Muddy Waters: "Parachute woman will you blow me out?/My heavy throbber's itching just to lay a solid rhythm down."

Mick Jagger is on lead vocals and Keith Richards is on electric lead guitar. Both Mick Jagger and Brian Jones play harmonica (Brian plays through the song's verses, while Mick's comes in at the end of the song).

== Credits and personnel ==
- Mick Jagger – vocals, harmonica (coda)
- Keith Richards – electric guitar
- Brian Jones – acoustic guitar, harmonica
- Bill Wyman – bass
- Charlie Watts – drums
