= Chancel flowers =

Christian church decoration

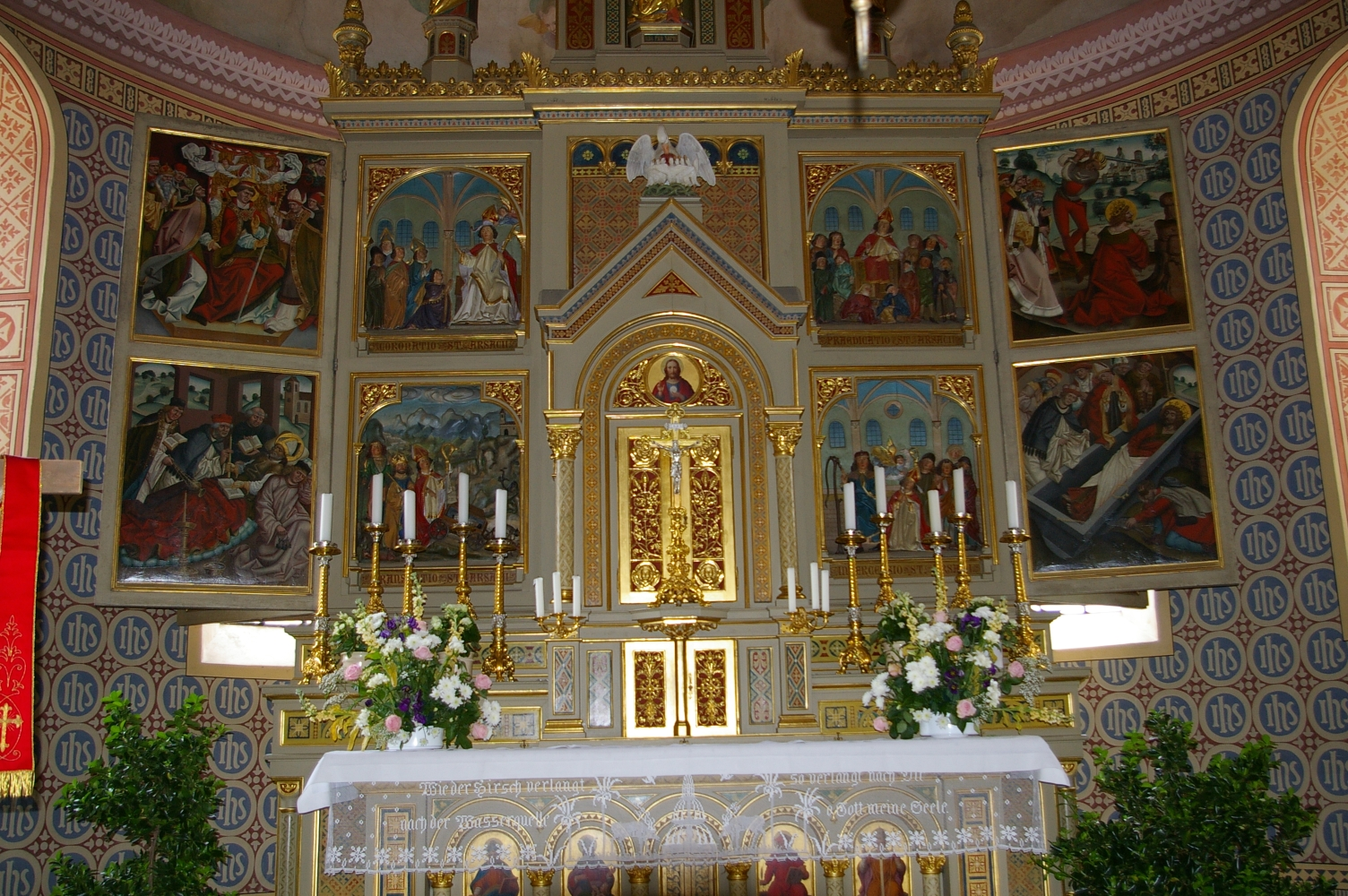
Chancel flowers, placed upon the altar of St. Arsatius's Church in Ilmmünster.

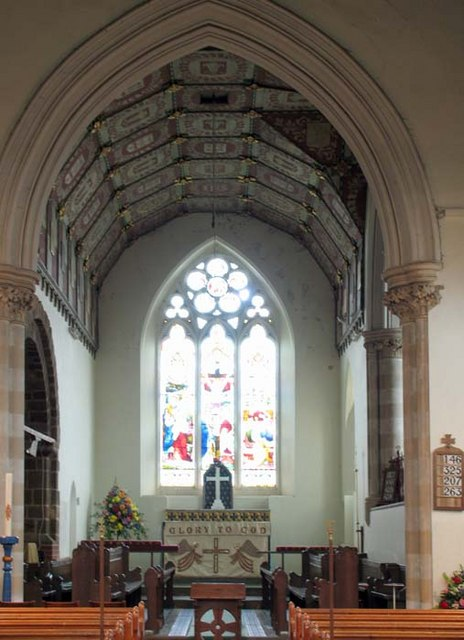
Chancel flowers adorn the presbytery of St Peter's Church in Lilley, Hertfordshire.

Chancel flowers (also known as altar flowers) are flowers that are placed in the chancel of a Christian church. These chancel flowers are often paid for by members of a congregation as an offering of thanksgiving to God. Chancel flowers are often placed upon or adjacent to the altar table, as well as near other church furniture in the chancel, such as the baptismal font, lectern and pulpit.

Chancel flowers are sometimes dedicated to the memory of someone who has died by the purchasing family. Certain species of flowers are used during the various liturgical seasons of the Christian kalendar, such as poinsettias during Christmastide (symbolic of the Star of Bethlehem) and Easter lilies during Eastertide (symbolic of the resurrection of Jesus).

Many historic Christian denominations, such as the Methodist Churches, only permit live flowers upon the chancel:

Since flowers symbolize the resurrection, and in keeping with the principle of integrity, no type of artificial flower or plant is appropriate to the environment of worship. If for a given service no fresh flowers are available, there are several alternatives. One is to use evergreens or mixed greenery. ... Anything that expresses falseness or pretence, or that is gaudy or cheaply ornate, should be avoided.

— United Methodist Altars: A Guide for the Local Church

The Catholic Church likewise teaches that "the use of living flowers and plants, rather than artificial greens, serves as a reminder of the gift of life God has given to the human community."

== In other religions ==
Altar flowers are also used in other religious traditions. In Japanese Buddhism, altar flowers are associated with ikebana (also known as kadō, "way of flowers" or art of flower arranging) and are part of traditional altar arrangements, called mitsu-gusoku (three-article arrangement) and go-gusoku (five-article arrangement).

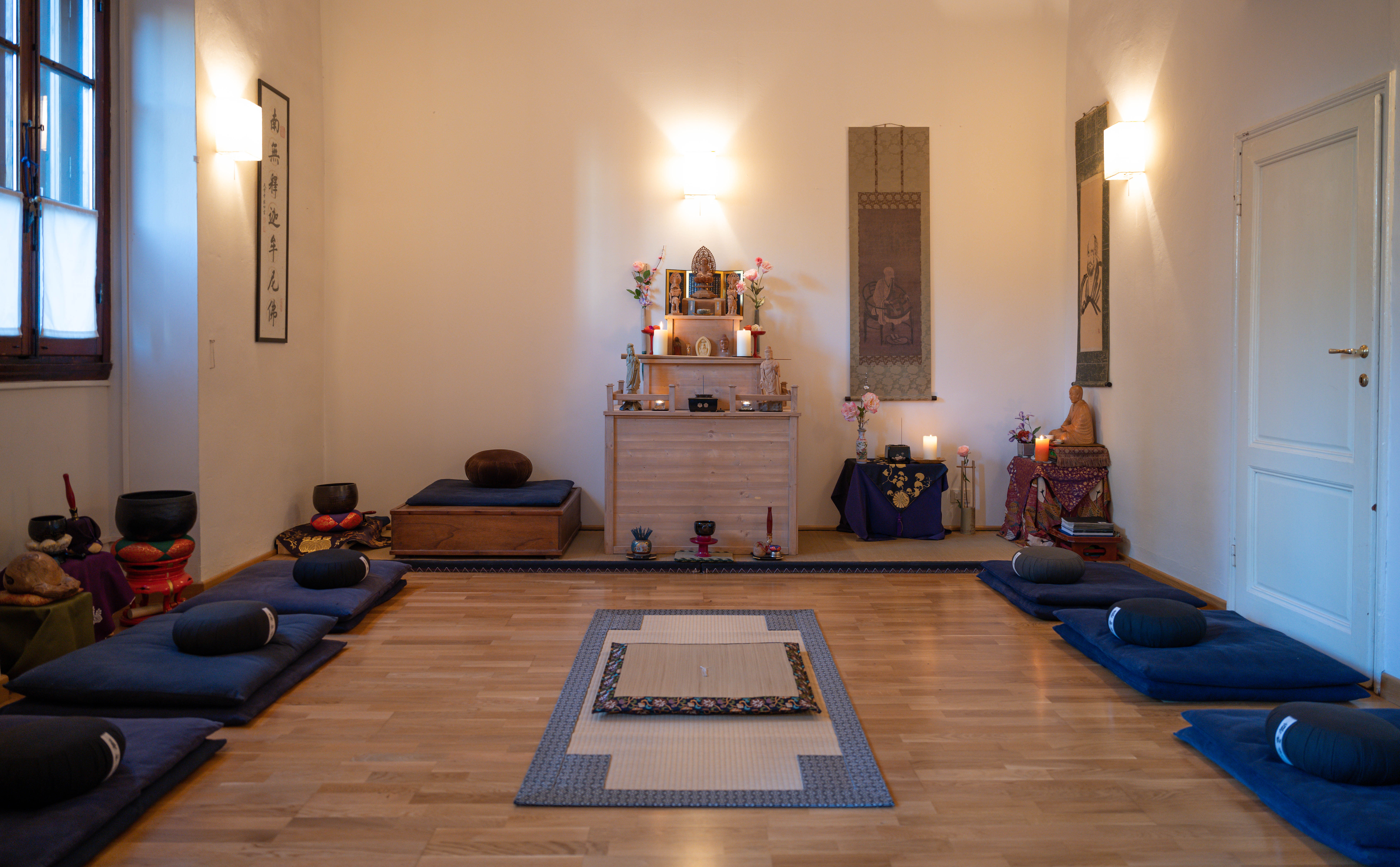
Altar flowers adorn three altars in the zendō (meditation hall) of the Shinnyoji Sōtō Zen temple in Florence, Italy.

== See also ==
- Flower arrangement
- Flowers in Judaism
- Language of flowers
