= Kogetsu Enshū-ryū Zen Sadō =

School of Japanese tea ceremony

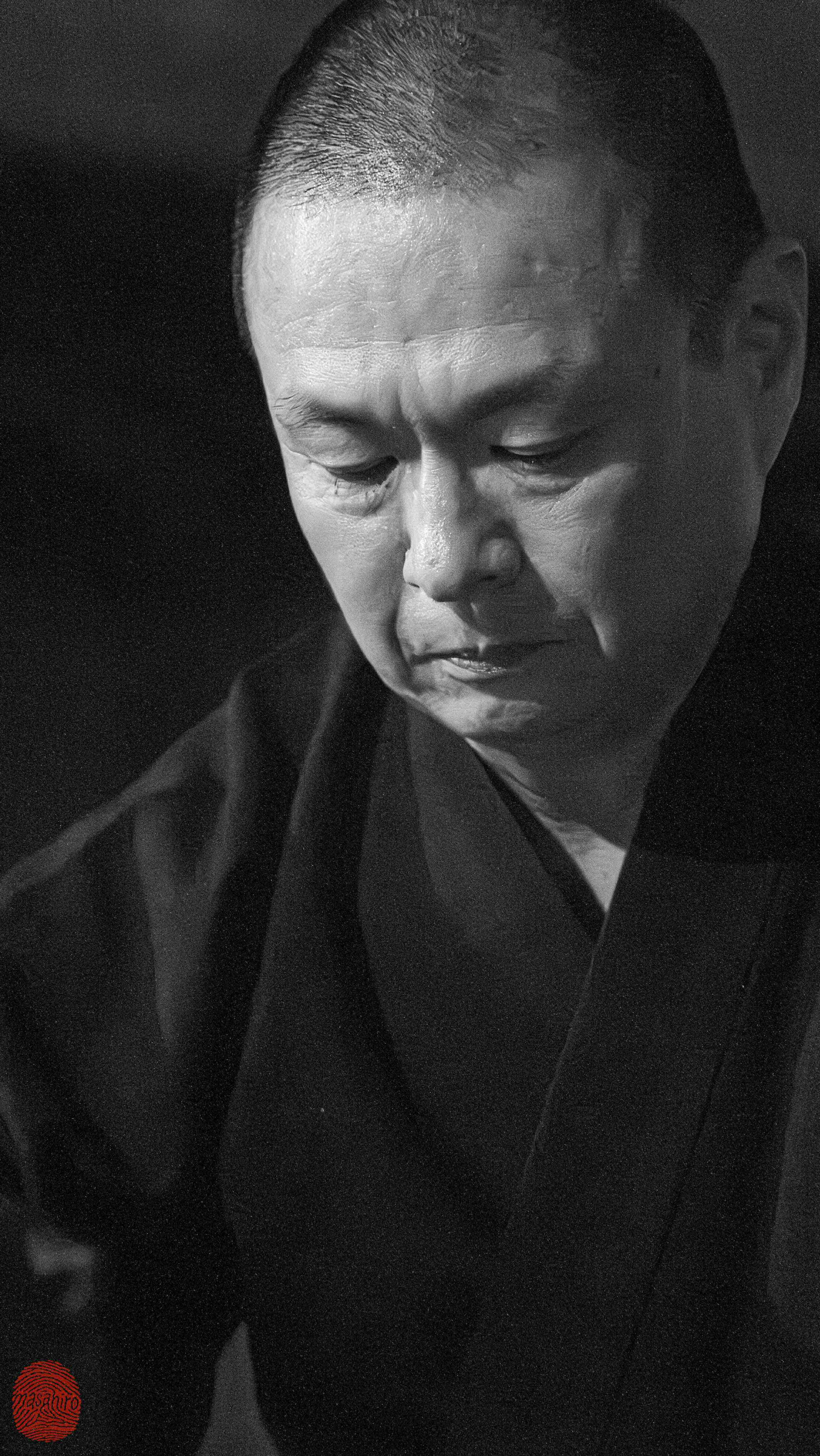
Nakamura Nyosen Sensei, the current Sōke (Headmaster) of the Kogetsu Enshū School of Zen Tea Ceremony

Kogetsu Enshū-ryū Zen Sadō (壺月遠州流禅茶道), "Kogetsu Enshū School of Zen Tea Ceremony", is one of the schools of Japanese tea ceremony.

The school follows the Enshū style of samurai tea ceremony (Buke sadō or Buke chadō), originally founded by the renowned early Edo-period tea master Kobori Enshū. Kogetsu Enshū practice emphasizes the principle of chazen ichimi —“the unity of Zen and tea”— integrating the spiritual discipline of Zen with the refined aesthetics and martial ethos of samurai tea culture. Even among the various schools of samurai tea ceremony, the Kogetsu Enshū School is particularly noted for its emphasis on simplicity, and for body usage that has much in common with martial arts.

Currently based in the Shōnan area of Kanagawa Prefecture, the Kogetsu Enshū School offers tea ceremony classes in Yokohama, Tokyo, Chiba, Shizuoka, and several other locations in Japan.

== History ==
Aoyagi Kankō studied under Komiyama Munemasa, an advisor to the Enshū school. Based on the guidance of his spiritual teacher Watanabe Kaigyoku, Kankō branched off from the Enshū school, wishing to reform the way of tea ceremony by establishing a school emphasizing aspects of spiritual training. Since Kaigyoku had taken the name Kogetsu Taiyo, Kankō named the new school Kogetsu Enshū-ryū Zen Sadō.

A notable student of the Kogetsu Enshū School was the first Asian winner of the Nobel Prize in Literature, the Indian poet Rabindranath Tagore. He studied under Kankō in July 1921 (Taishō 10), during the time Kankō served as a lecturer in tea ceremony at Shantiniketan (Visva-Bharati) University in Bolpur, West Bengal, India.

== Headmasters (Sōke) ==
generation	religious name	legal name		comment
1st (honorary)	壺月諦誉 (Kogetsu Taiyo)	渡辺海旭 (Watanabe Kaigyoku）	1872-1933	Served as the 3rd Principal of Shiba Gakuen, Professor at Taishō University and Toyo University
2nd	六字庵理貫 (Rokujian Rikan）	青柳貫孝 (Aoyagi Kankō)	1894-1983	Head Priest of the Hongō Chōsenji Temple, Head Priest of Nanyōji Temple, Founder of Saipan Home Economics School for Girls
3rd	六字庵如光 (Rokujian Nyokō)	中村名聞 (Nakamura Myōmon)	1946-2005	Opened Tentōzan Butsumoji Temple
4th (current)	六字庵如栴 (Rokujian Nyosen)	中村應信 (Nakamura Ōshin)	1973-	Chairman of the Kogetsu Enshū School of Zen Tea Ceremony
