= Chancel =

Area around the altar of a Christian church

Plan of a large Latin cross church, with the chancel (strict definition) highlighted. This chancel terminates in a semicircular sanctuary in the apse, and is separated from the curved walls to the east in the diagram by an ambulatory.

In church architecture, the chancel (also known as the sanctuary or presbyterium) is the space around the altar, including the choir, at the liturgical east end of a traditional Christian church building. It may terminate in an apse.

== Overview ==
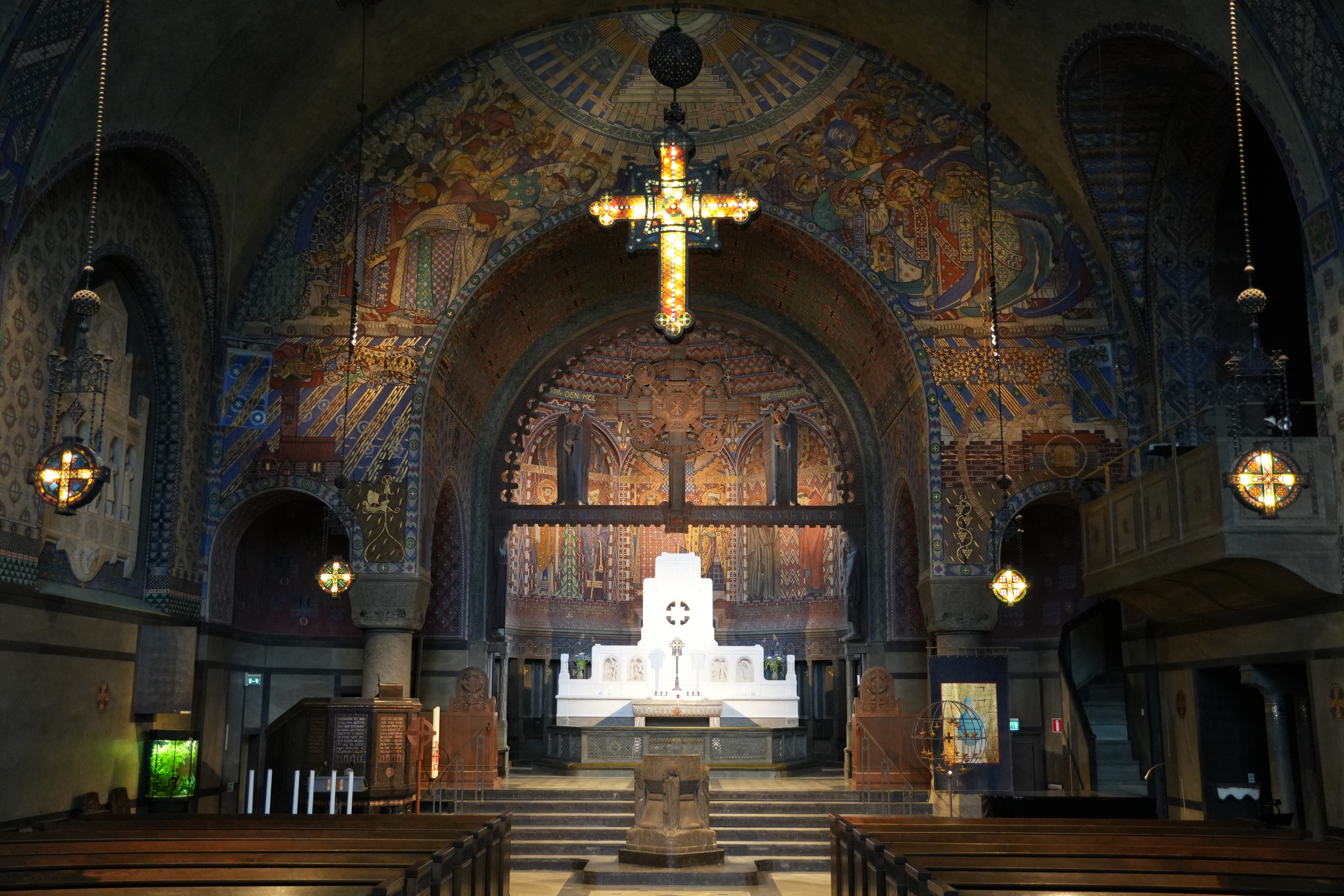
The chancel of the Church of the Revelation, an Evangelical-Lutheran parish of the Church of Sweden in the locality of Saltsjöbaden. The rood screen and chancel arch are visible from the nave.

Plan with the broader definition of the chancel highlighted

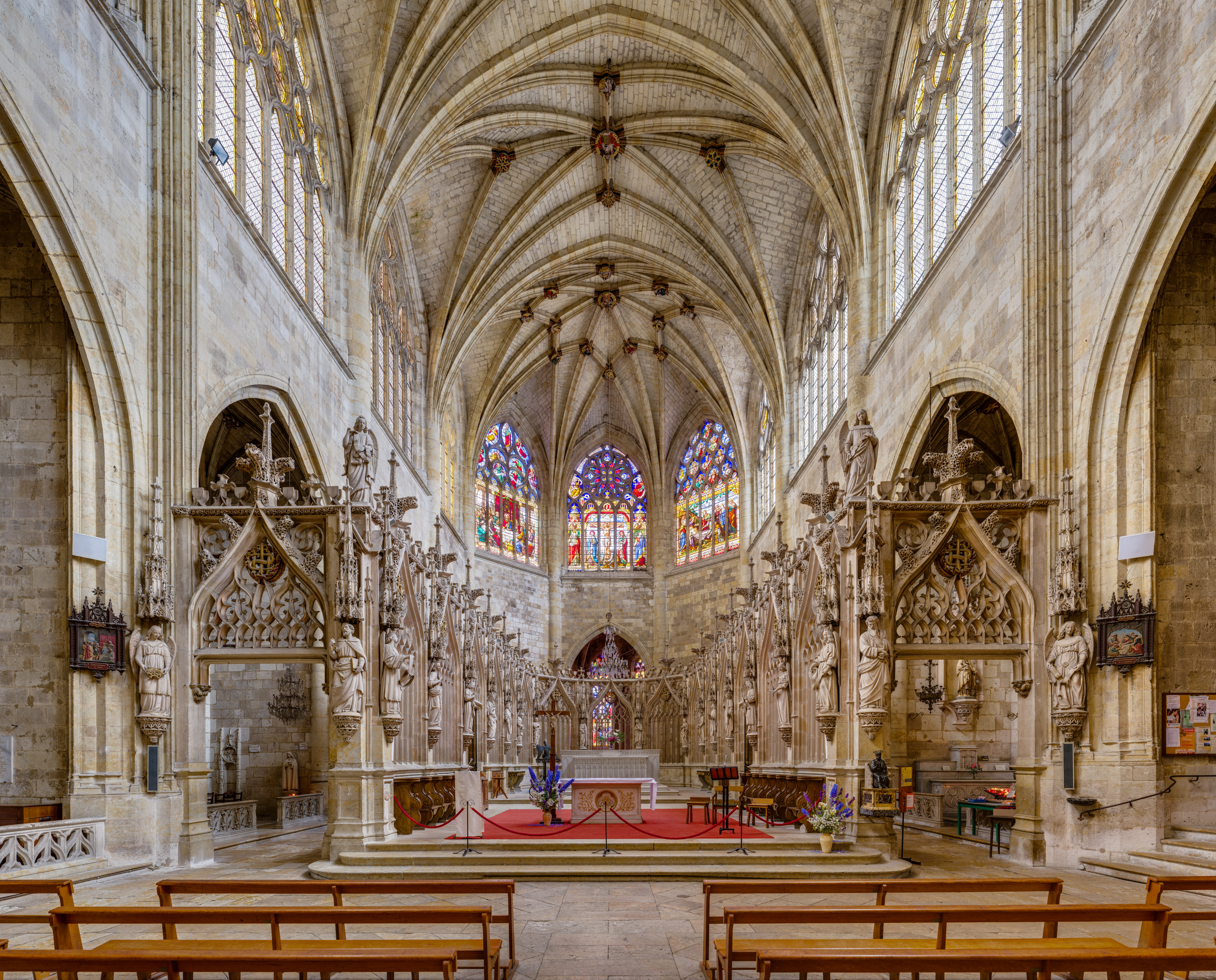
View from the nave of the chancel of Condom Cathedral in France, with ambulatories and two altars, the modern one in the choir

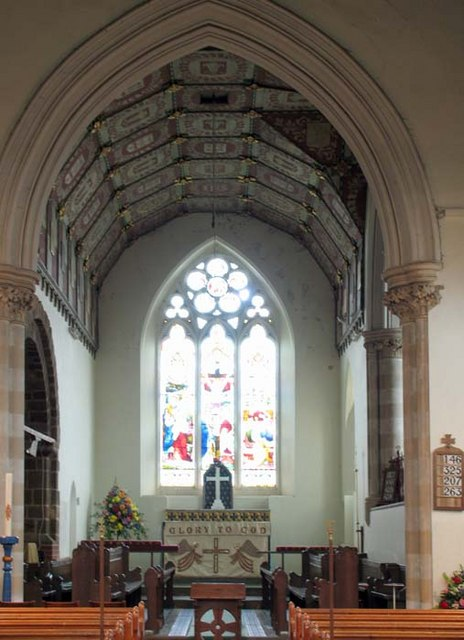
St Peter's, Lilley, Hertfordshire a medium-sized English church showing the nave, chancel arch, and a chancel with choir and sanctuary

The chancel is generally the area used by the clergy and choir during worship, while the congregation is in the nave. Direct access may be provided by a priest's door, usually on the south side of the church. This is one definition, sometimes called the "strict" one; in practice in churches where the eastern end contains other elements such as an ambulatory and side chapels, these are also often counted as part of the chancel, especially when discussing architecture. In smaller churches, where the altar is backed by the outside east wall and there is no distinct choir, the chancel and sanctuary may be the same area. In churches with a retroquire area behind the altar, this may only be included in the broader definition of chancel.

In a cathedral or other large church, there may be a distinct choir area at the start of the chancel (looking from the nave), before reaching the sanctuary, and an ambulatory may run beside and behind it. All these may be included in the chancel, at least in architectural terms (see above). In many churches, the altar has now been moved to the front of the chancel, in what was built as the choir area, or to the centre of the transept, somewhat confusing the distinction between chancel, choir and sanctuary. In churches with less traditional plans, the term may not be useful in either architectural or ecclesiastical terms. The chancel may be a step or two higher than the level of the nave, and the sanctuary is often raised still further. The chancel is very often separated from the nave by altar rails, or a rood screen, a sanctuary bar, or an open space, and its width and roof height is often different from that of the nave; usually the chancel will be narrower and lower.

In churches with a traditional Latin cross plan, and a transept and central crossing, the chancel usually begins at the eastern side of the central crossing, often under an extra-large chancel arch supporting the crossing and the roof. This is an arch which separates the chancel from the nave and transept of a church. If the chancel, strictly defined as choir and sanctuary, does not fill the full width of a medieval church, there will usually be some form of low wall or screen at its sides, demarcating it from the ambulatory or parallel side chapels.

As well as the altar, the sanctuary may house a credence table and seats for officiating and assisting ministers. In some churches, the congregation may gather on three sides or in a semicircle around the chancel. In some churches, the pulpit and lectern may be in the chancel, but in others these, especially the pulpit, are in the nave. The presbytery is often adorned with chancel flowers.

== Name ==
The word "chancel" derives from the French usage of chancel from the Late Latin word cancellus ("lattice"). This refers to the typical form of rood screens. The chancel was formerly known as the presbytery, because it was reserved for the clergy.

== History ==
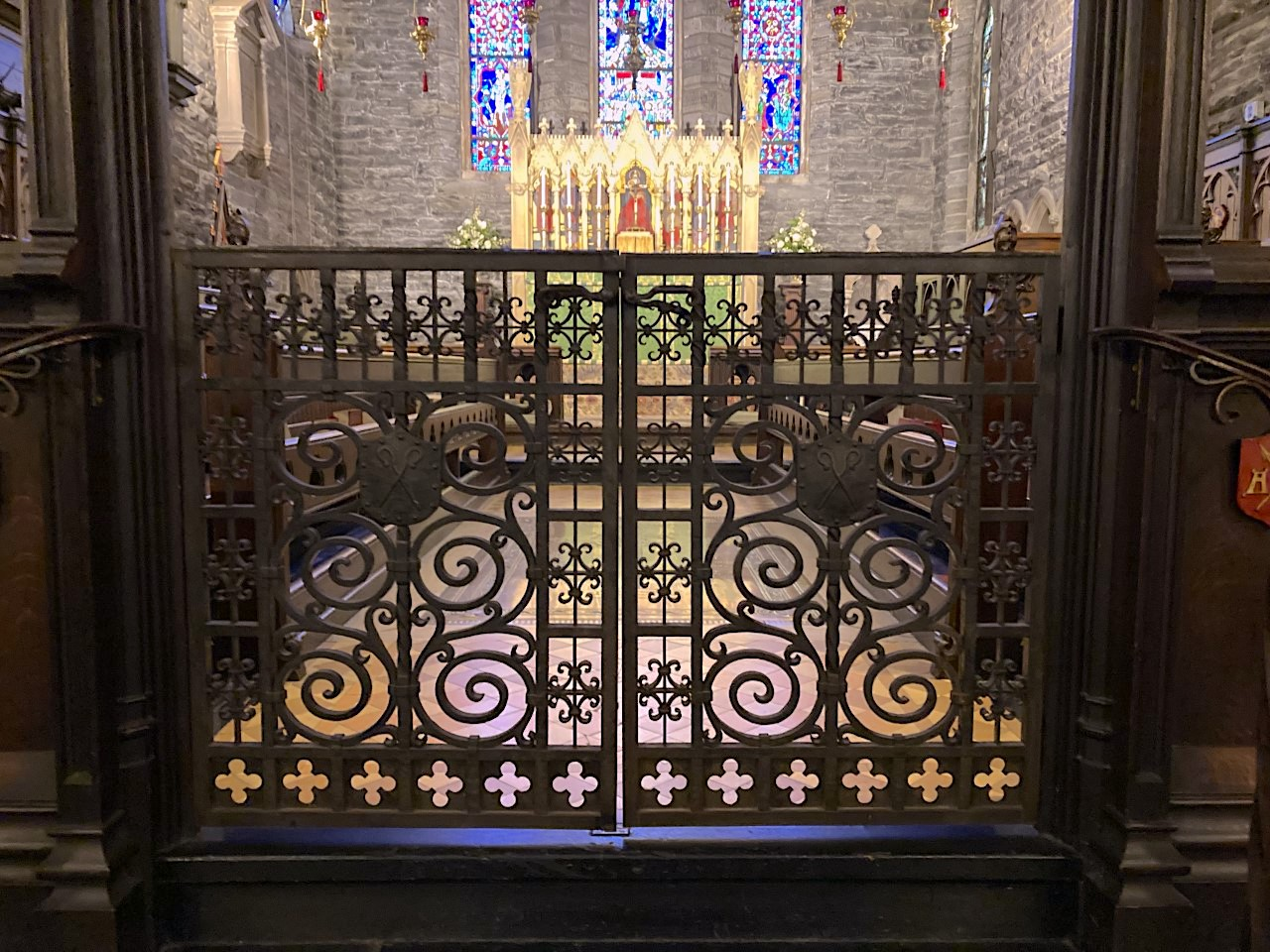
Iron entry gates to the chancel at the Episcopal Church of the Good Shepherd (Rosemont, Pennsylvania), USA, designed by master blacksmith Samuel Yellin

In Early Christian architecture the templon was a barrier dividing off the sanctuary from the rest of the church; in Eastern Christianity this developed into different arrangements from those of the Western church, with the sanctuary often not visible to the congregation. In the West the ciborium, an open-walled but usually roofed structure sheltering the altar, became common, and was originally fitted with curtains that were drawn and pulled back at different points in the Mass, in a way that some Oriental Orthodox churches still practice today. A large (or "deep") chancel made most sense in monasteries and cathedrals where there was a large number of singing clergy and boys from a choir school to occupy the choir. In many orders "choir monk" was a term used to distinguish the educated monks who had taken full vows, or were training to do so, from another class, called "lay brothers" or other terms, who had taken lesser vows and mostly did manual tasks, including farming the monastery's land. These usually sat in the nave, with any lay congregation.

Following the exposition of the doctrine of transubstantiation at the fourth Lateran Council of 1215, clergy were required to ensure that the blessed sacrament was to be kept protected from irreverent access or abuse; and accordingly the area of the church used by the lay congregation was to be screened off from that used by the clergy. This distinction was enforced by the development of canon law, by which the construction and upkeep of the chancel was the responsibility of the rector, whereas the construction and upkeep of the nave was the responsibility of the parish. Barriers demarcating the chancel became increasingly elaborate, but were largely swept away after both the Protestant Reformation and then the Counter-Reformation prioritized the congregation having a good view of what was happening in the chancel. Now the low communion rail is generally the only barrier; despite being essentially a Counter-Reformation invention, this has proved useful and accepted in the Protestant churches that dispense communion. However the screen enjoyed a small revival in the 19th century, after the passionate urgings of Augustus Pugin, who wrote A Treatise on Chancel Screens and Rood Lofts, and others.

The Reformed Churches (inclusive of the Continental Reformed, Anglican, and Presbyterian denominations) generally moved the communion table forward, typically to the front of the chancel, and often used lay choirs who were placed in a gallery at the west end. The rear of deep chancels became little used in churches surviving from the Middle Ages, and new churches very often omitted one. With the emphasis on sermons, and their audibility, some churches simply converted their chancels to seat part of the congregation. In 19th-century England one of the battles of the Cambridge Camden Society, the architectural wing of the Anglo-Catholics in the Church of England, was to restore the chancel as a necessary part of a church. By pushing the altar back to its medieval position and having the choir used by a lay choir, they were largely successful in this, although the harder end of the High Church objected to allowing a large group of laity into the chancel. Different approaches to worship in the 20th century again tended to push altars in larger churches forward, to be closer to the congregation, and the chancel again risks being a less used area of the church. A number of Evangelical-Lutheran churches retained the traditional position of the altar against the eastern wall. Chancels remain an integral part of Evangelical-Lutheran and Roman Catholic churches, though chancel rails have become less common in Roman Catholic churches since the Second Vatican Council (though Evangelical-Lutheran churches have retained the chancel rail).

== Gallery ==
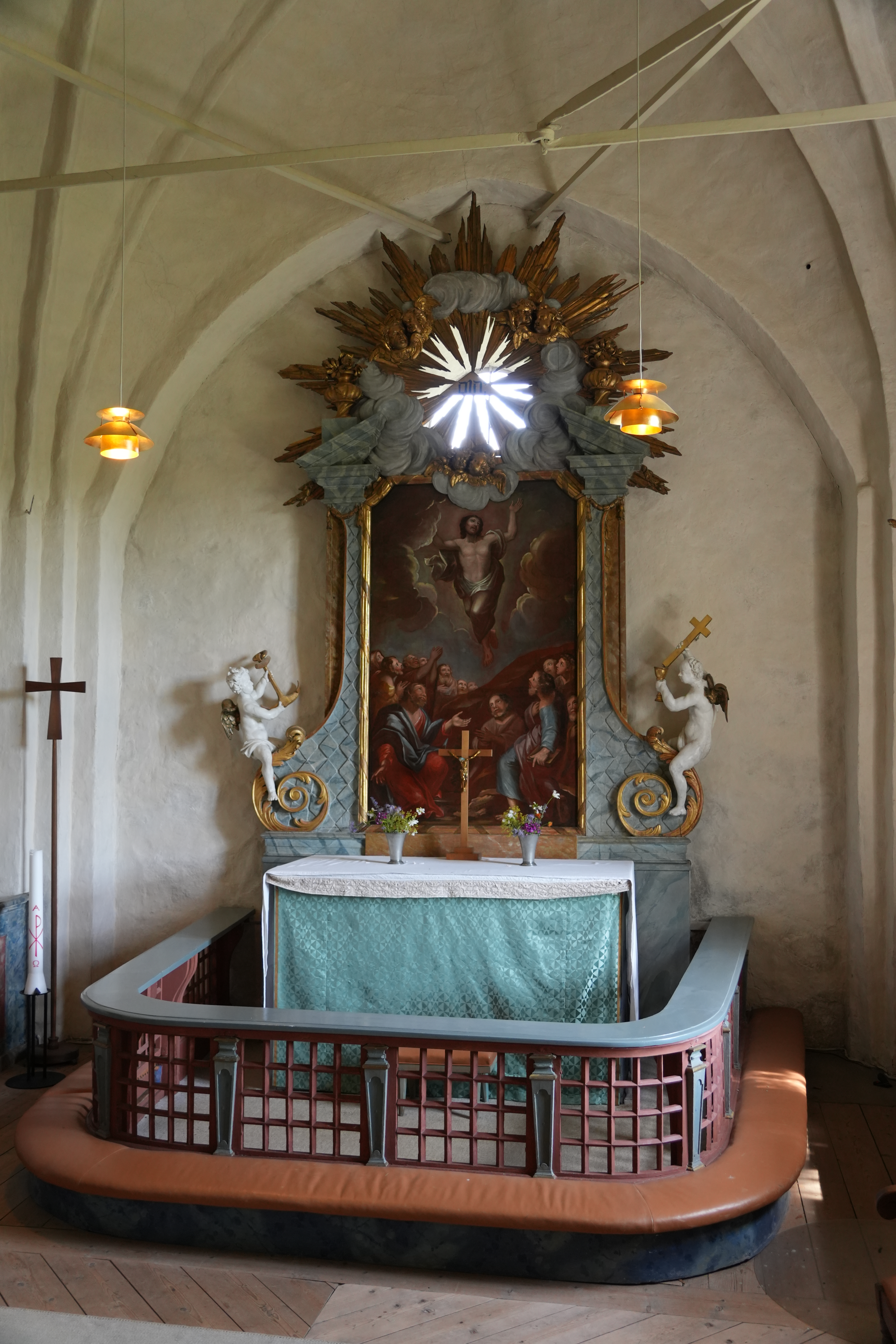
The chancel of Husby-Sjuhundra Church (Evangelical-Lutheran) in Norrtälje, Sweden

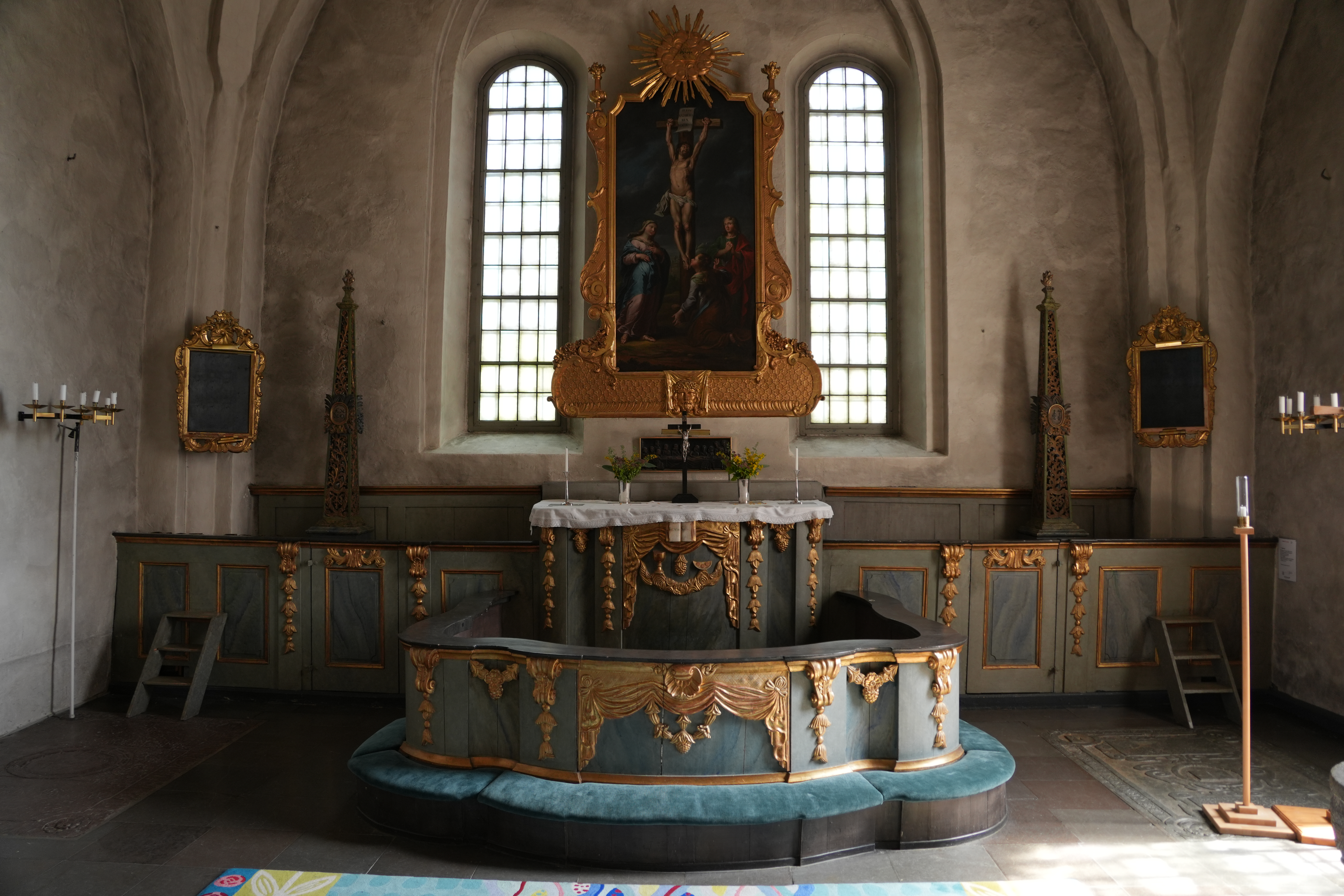
The chancel of Frötuna Church (Evangelical-Lutheran) in Norrtälje, Sweden

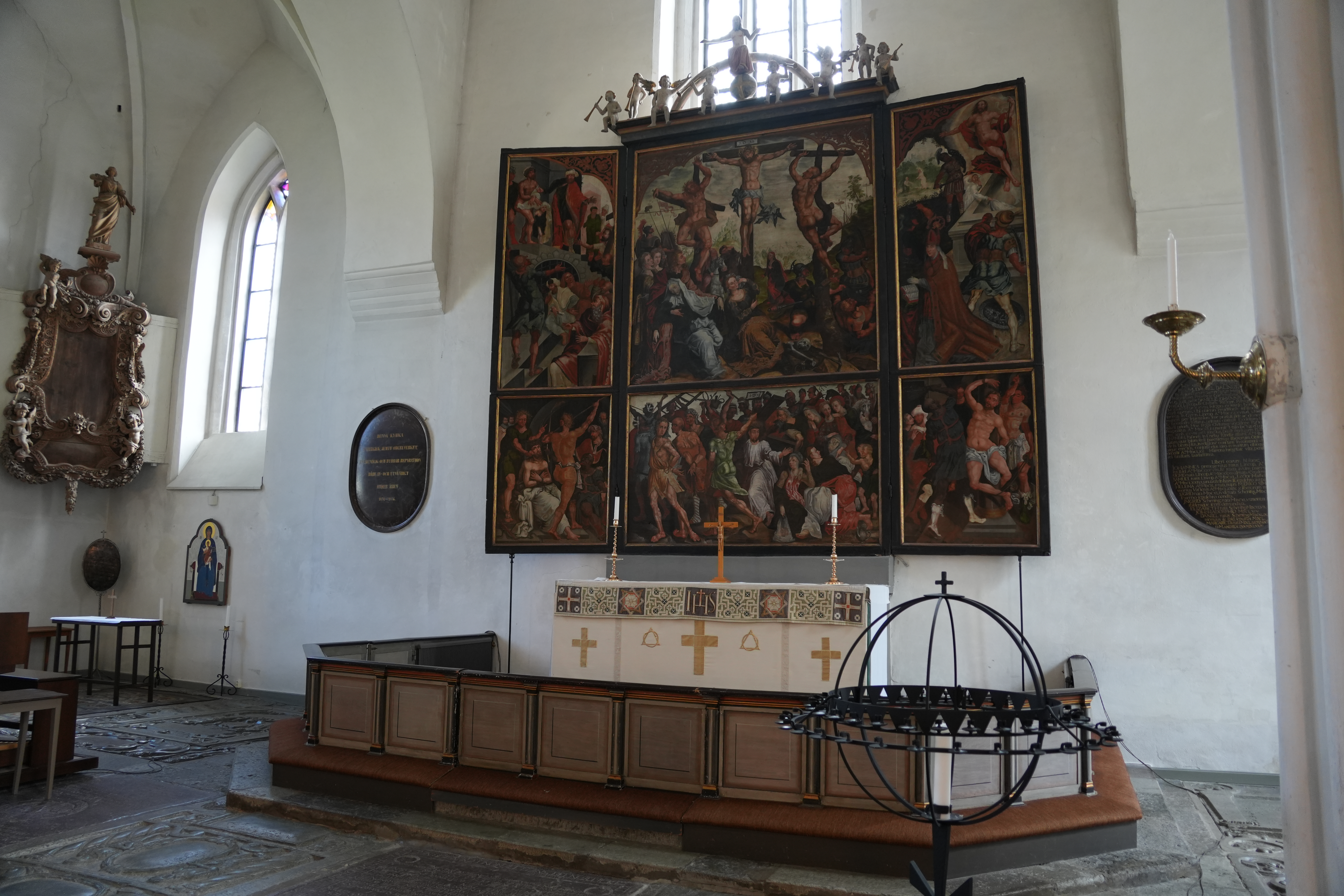
The chancel of the Church of our Lady (Evangelical-Lutheran) in Skänninge, Sweden

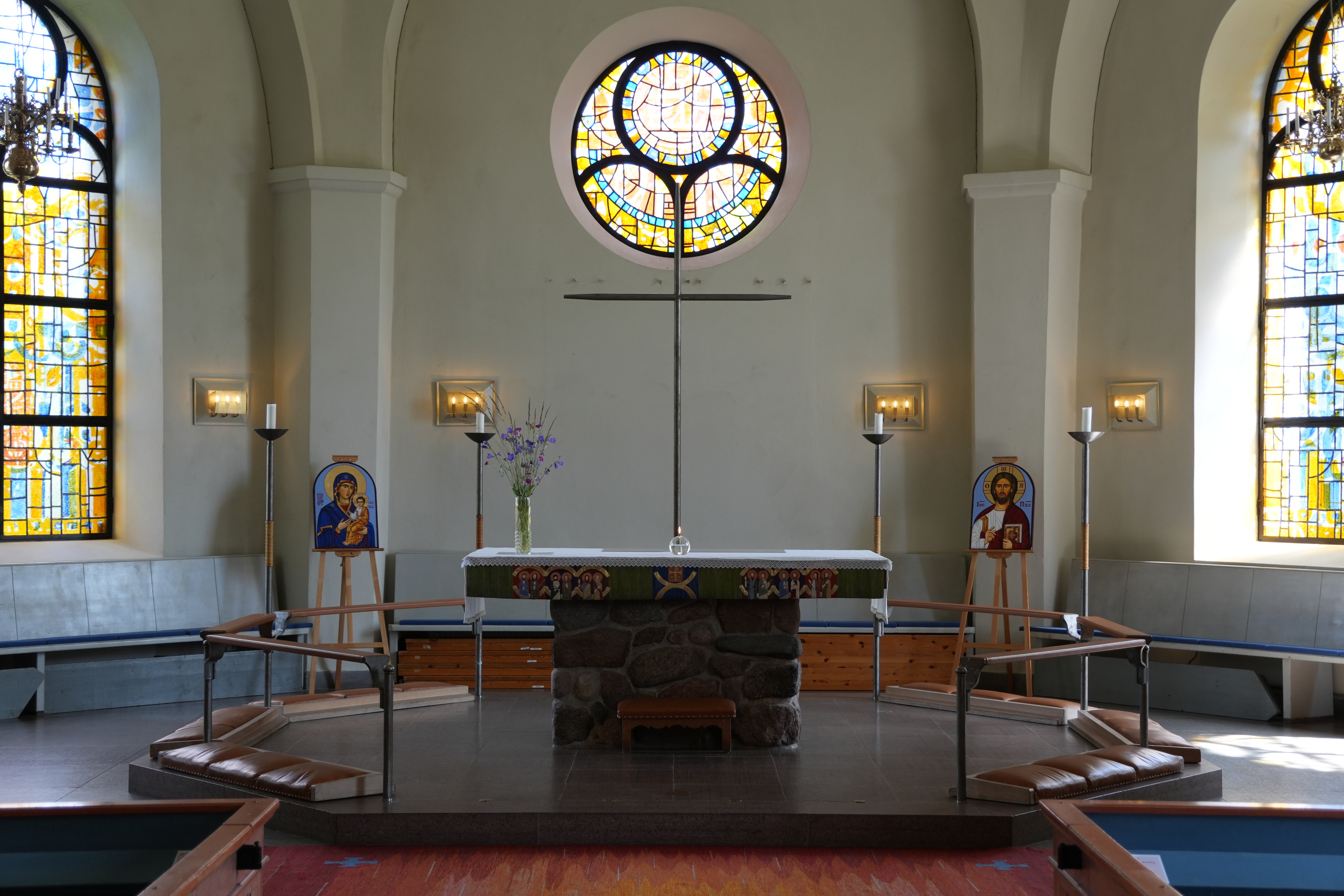
The chancel of Norrtälje Evangelical-Lutheran Church in Stockholm County, Sweden

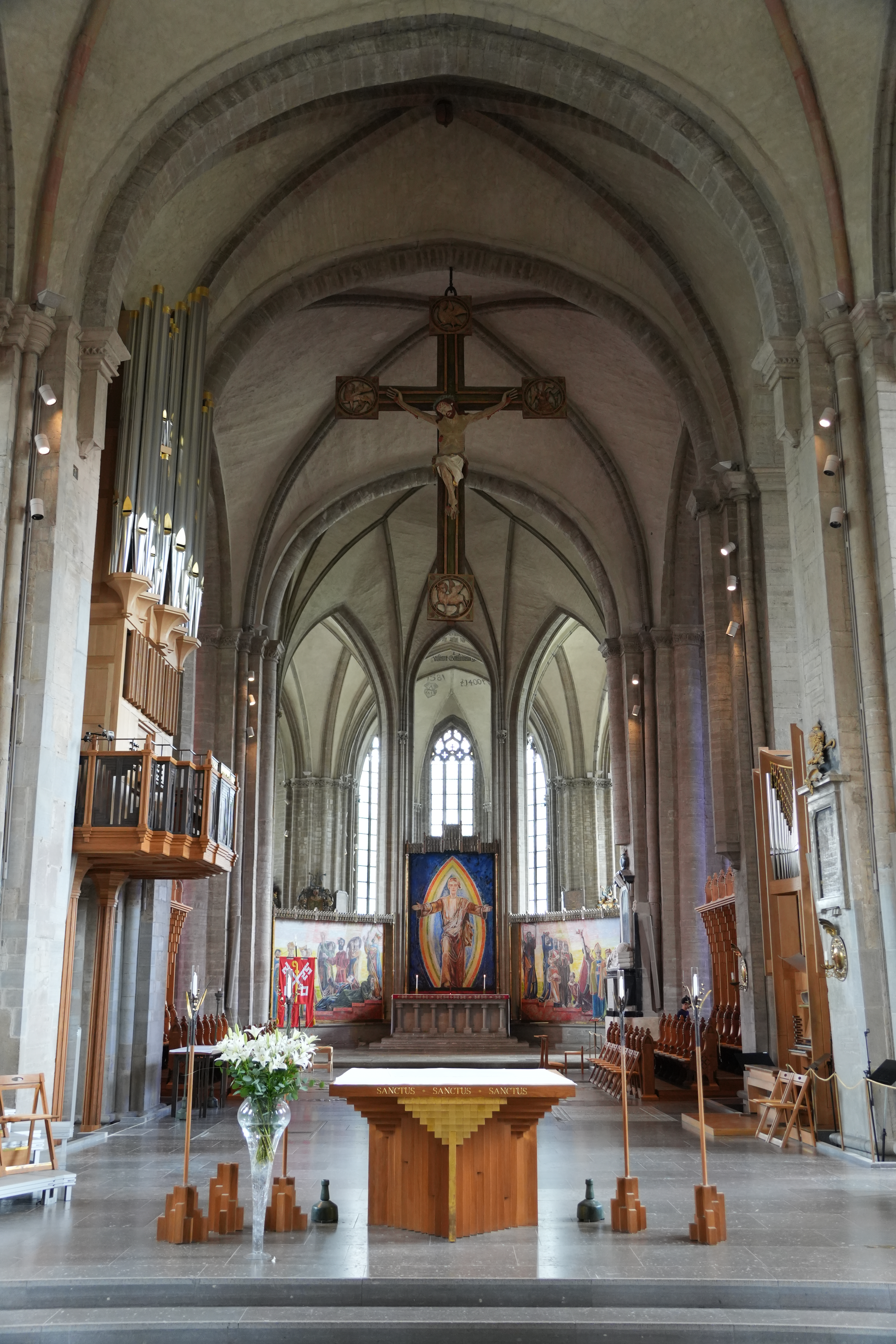
The chancel of Linköping Cathedral (Evangelical-Lutheran) in Sweden

The chancel of Röks Church (Evangelical-Lutheran) in Ödeshög, Sweden
