= Yuki Tsuji =

Japanese artist

- Born: November 29, 1983 (age 42); Fuji, Shizuoka, Japan
- Notable work: 2016 Performance at Carnegie Hall in New York City; 2016 Presentation for HM the Emperor and HM the Empress of Japan upon the visit of HM King Felipe VI of Spain.
- Style: Ikebana
- Website: yukitsuji.com

Yuki Tsuji (辻 雄貴, Tsuji Yuki; born November 29, 1983) is a Japanese ikebana artist, a master of the Japanese art of flower arrangement.

== Biography ==
Yuki Tsuji was born in Shizuoka Prefecture, Japan in Fuji-shi. He earned his master's degree in the Department of Architecture, Graduate School of Engineering at Kogakuin University. Tsuji was introduced to ikebana and started to study under Reiko Takenaka during his years as a graduate student of architecture.

Tsuji's work with ikebana and explores the inter-relationships amongst humans, architecture, and plants. He seeks to express such relationships by fusing plants' vitality and human creativity beyond traditional frameworks within architectural design, scenography, sculpture, and product design.

- In 2013, Tsuji created the stage design for the Noh Performance at the Château de Fère-en-Tardenois in France in commemoration of the 650th Zeami and the 680th Kan'ami anniversaries.
- In 2016, Tsuji performed at Carnegie Hall for the annual Carnegie Hall Notables event. This made Tsuji the first artist to ever perform ikebana at a Carnegie Hall presents event.
- In April 2017, Tsuji presented his work to His Majesty the Emperor Akihito and Her Majesty the Empress Michiko of Japan upon the visit of His Majesty King Felipe VI of Spain and Queen Letizia of Spain.
