= Mitsu-gusoku =

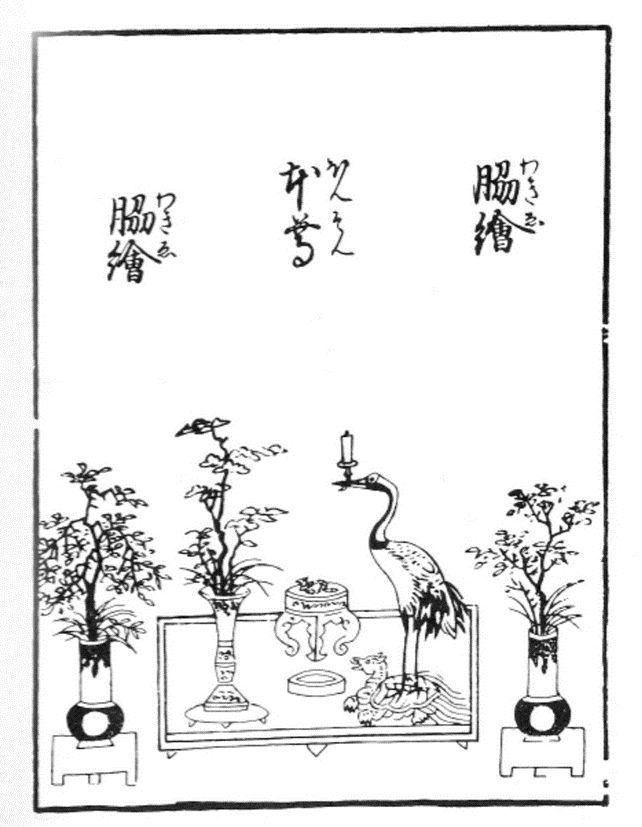
A drawing of mitsu-gusoku, from the Senden-shō (15-18th century)

Mitsu-gusoku (Japanese: 三具足) in Japanese Buddhism is a traditional arrangement of three articles, often displayed in front of a painting of the Buddha or important Buddhist figures.

The articles normally consist of a censer, a candlestick, later in the shape of a red-crowned crane, and a vase for flower offerings. They are placed next to each other either on a tablet or a small table. This type of arrangement became popular during the Kamakura period and Nanbokucho period. The tatehana ("standing flowers") style of the mitsu-gusoku was the earliest form of flower arrangements in Japan, which was later formalised into the art of ikebana. It is mentioned that starting in the mid-15th century, the priest Ikenobō Senkei of the Rokkaku-dō in Kyoto developed new approaches and techniques to flower arrangements, for which he received praise.

A variance exists which uses five articles, known as go-gusoku (五具足).
