= Flowers in Judaism =

Flowers in Judaism hold historical and cultural significance within its traditions and practices. Flowers are especially used in synagogues and homes during the celebration of Shavuot.

== Biblical and Talmudic sources ==
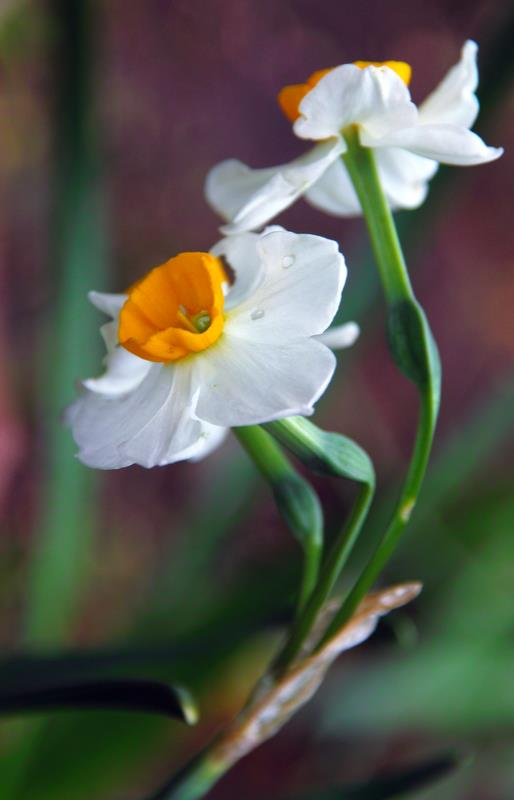
Narcissus tazetta in Israel

In the Tanakh, among the various native flowers of ancient Israel three flowers are specifically mentioned by name: the shoshan or shoshannah, often translated as lily or rose and likely referring to the white lily; shoshannat ha'amakim (lit. 'lily of the valley'), likely the narcissus; and ḥavatzelet ha-Sharon (lit. 'rose/lily of the Sharon'), likely the sea daffodil. Solomon likens his Shulamite love interest to the last-named flower, also referred to in the Mishnah as the "king's rose."

According to the Tanakh, ancient Jews made use of flowers as a natural form of decoration. In Jerusalem, during Shavuot, the first crop of fruits presented at the altar was adorned with the finest blossoms. The high regard for flowers in ancient Jewish culture is further evidenced by the presence of floral motifs its artistic creations. Examples include the Temple menorah, the pillars of the Temple, and the Molten Sea adorned with "lily flowers." The Talmud states that Solomon's Temple contained golden representations of various aromatic trees in full fruit, from which fragrant perfumes exhaled with the movement of the air.

== Shavuot ==
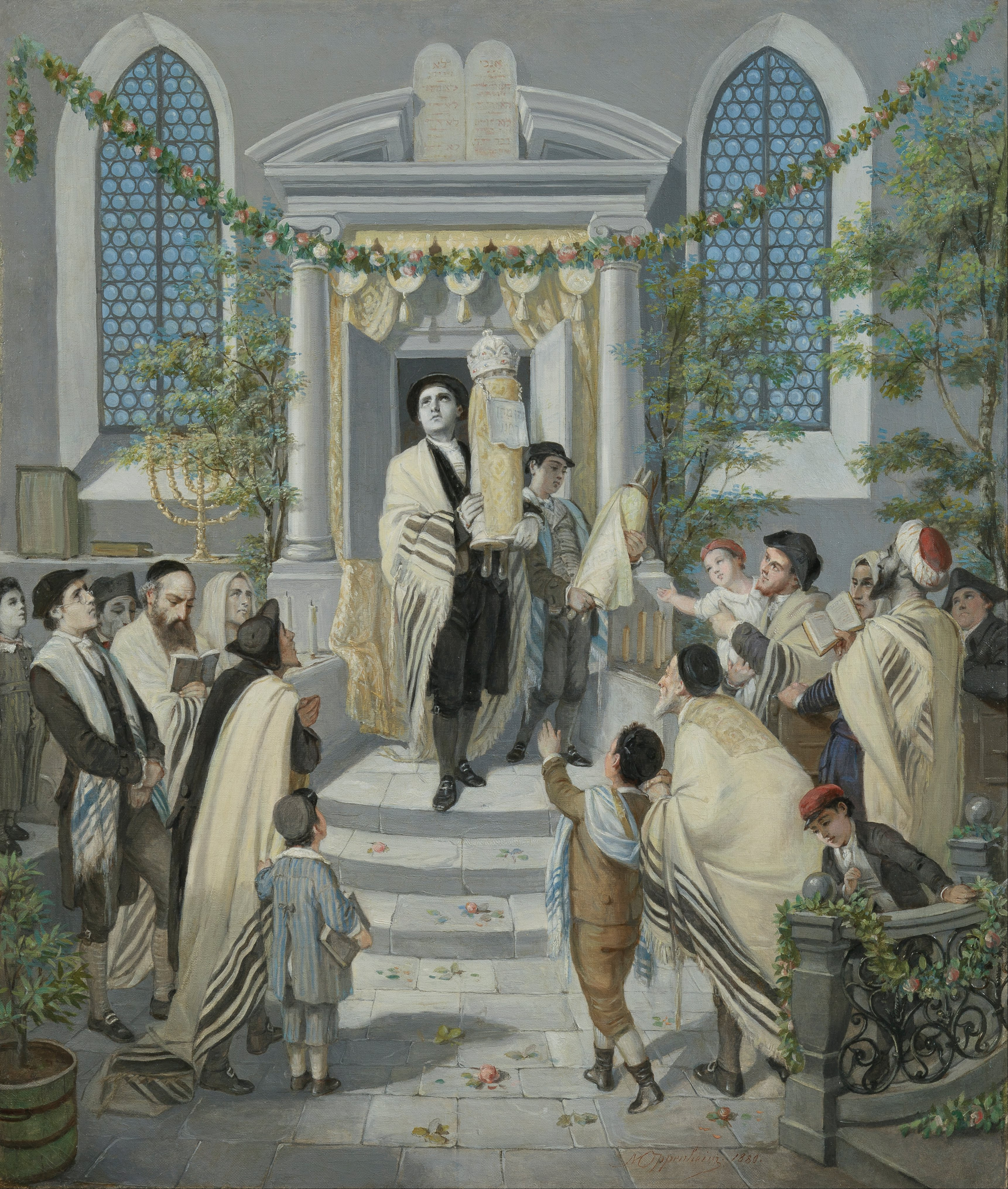
Shavuot by Moritz Daniel Oppenheim

In many Jewish communities, there is a custom to decorate homes and synagogues with flowers on Shavuot. Some synagogues decorate the bimah with a canopy of flowers and plants reminiscent of a ḥuppah, as the giving of the Torah is metaphorically seen as a marriage between the Torah and the people of Israel.

The Maharil was the first to mention the custom of scattering roses and other fragrant blossoms on the synagogue floor as an expression of joy during the festival. The Magen Abraham noted the customary placement of trees in synagogues, though the Vilna Gaon discouraged this practice, deeming it an imitation of Christian practice on Pentecost.

Isaiah Hurwitz, in his Shelah, described a custom in Safed where the gabbai distributed fragrant weeds to every individual during the morning service on Shavuot, while the ḥazzan recited Ha-El be-ta'atzumot. In the Land of Israel, flowers were historically also distributed to congregants as they departed from Passover eve services.

One common explanation for these traditions is that Shavuot is designated as the judgment day of trees in the Talmud. Another is the Midrash that Mount Sinai blossomed with flowers in anticipation of the giving of the Torah on its summit.

== Memorial Day (Yom HaZikaron) ==
A new practice which is gaining popularity in Israel is to wear a pin of a "blood red" flower, known as דם המכבים (Blood of the Maccabees, Red Everlasting) or "Helichrysum sanguineum" on Memorial Day (Yom HaZikaron). The Hebrew name is credited to a legend that says that everywhere that a Maccabee soldier shed blood in battle, a flower would grow in that spot forever.
