= Enshū-ryū =

School of Japanese tea ceremony and ikebana

Enshū-ryū (遠州流) is a school of Japanese tea ceremony and also of ikebana, the art of flower arrangement. Another school is the Kobori Enshū-ryū.

It originated with Lord Kobori Enshū (1579–1647).

== Ikebana ==
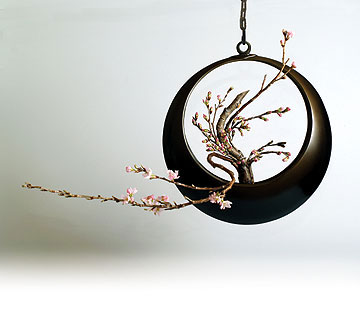
Flower arrangement with cherry blossom in a hanging bronze moon-vessel, by the Enshū-ryū school

The branches of the ikebana school are numerous. They include:

- Nihonbashi Enshū-ryū (日本橋遠州流)
- Shin Enshū-ryū
- Ango Enshū-ryū
- Miyako Enshū-ryū (都遠州流)
- Seifu Enshū-ryū
- Asakusa Enshū-ryū
