= Ikenobō =

School of ikebana

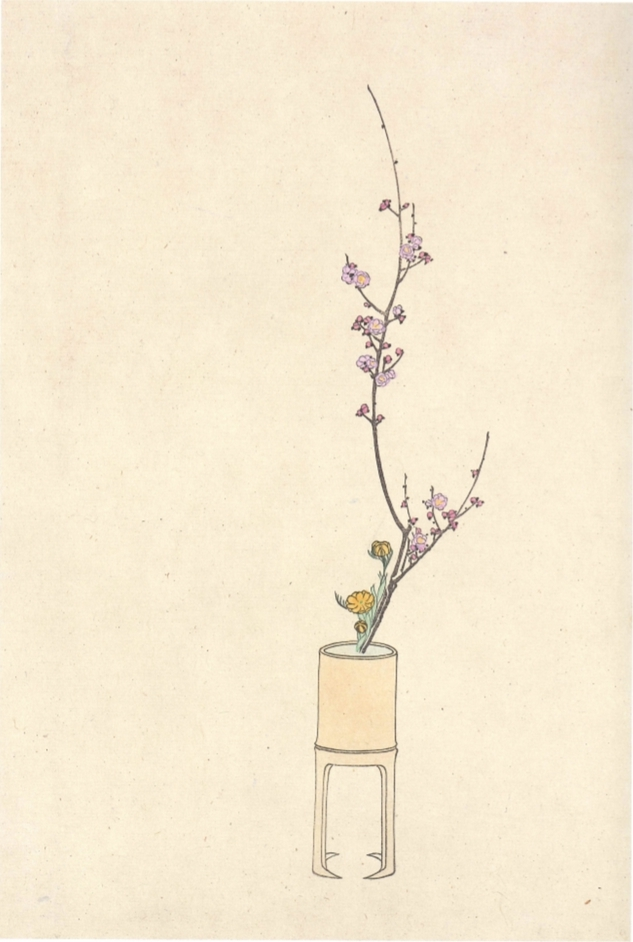
Shōka arrangement by the 40th headmaster Ikenobō Senjō, from the Sōka Hyakki by the Shijō school (1820)

Ikenobō (池坊) is the oldest and largest school of ikebana, the Japanese practice of giving plants and flowers invigorated new life.

The Buddhist practice of Ikenobo has existed since the building of the Rokkaku-do temple. The actual organized school institution was founded in the 15th century by the Buddhist monk Senno. The school is based at the Rokkaku-dō temple in Kyoto. The name is derived from the word combination of a pond (ike) where Prince Shōtoku (聖徳太子) had originally bathed while looking for the Rokkaku-do temple building site and the small hut built near the pond for subsequent priests to live in (bo).

== History ==
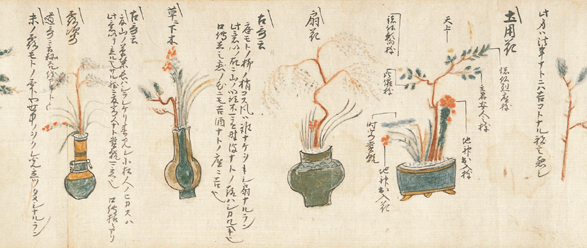
Illustration from the Kaō irai no Kadensho, believed to be the oldest extant manuscript of Ikenobo teaching, dating from a time shortly after that of Ikenobō Senkei. It shows various arranging styles of tatehana (ogibana) wide-mouth (right) and upright styles

The custom of placing flowers on the altar began when Buddhism was introduced to Japan by way of emissaries to China in about 538. In Japan people tried to give deeper meaning to the thoughts accompanying flower arranging. In other words, they wished to arrange flowers (tateru, to place, to give new life, to place in a standing manner), rather than casually placing them in a vase. An earlier attitude of passive appreciation developed into a more deeply considered approach. Early forms of Ikebana referred to as tatehana were arranged.

The Rokkaku-dō in Kyoto is the site of the birth and earliest development of ikebana. The name Rokkaku refers to the hexagonal shape of the temple. Rokkaku-dō temple was founded by Prince Shōtoku in the 6th century to enshrine a Nyoirin Kannon Bosatsu, the Goddess of Mercy.

Near a pond (ike) where Prince Shōtoku bathed, a small hut (bō; priest's lodge, monk's living house attached to a Buddhist temple) was built and became the home of succeeding generations of Buddhist priests. This gave rise to the name ikenobō. In the temple grounds, one stone is called Heso-ishi. It means "bellybutton stone". It is said that it was the foundation stone of the original temple. Because this temple existed before the transfer of the national capital to Kyoto in 794, it has been claimed to be the center of the city.

In the Heian period (794–1192), apart from altar offerings, the practice of enjoying flowers displayed beautifully in a vase became popular. Poems, novels and essays from that time contain many passages that describe the appreciation of flowers used in this way. In the early 7th century Ono no Imoko, a former Japanese envoy to China, became one of the first Buddhist priests at the Rokkaku-do and started placing flowers at the temple.

According to a 15th-century manuscript, two of the most popular flower arrangers of the time were ikenobō master Senkei and Ryu-ami, a tea master. Unzen Taigyoku, a monk belonging to a Zen Monastery, first recorded the name Senkei in his journal called Hekizan Nichiroku. In an entry dated February 25 of the third year of the Kanshō era (1462), Unzen Taigyoku wrote, “at the invitation of Shunko, Senkei made a floral arrangement in a golden vase and denizens of Kyoto with refined tastes vied to see his work”. This written record marks the starting point for 550 years of recorded ikebana history. Additional historical documentation of Senkei's work includes only one entry, on October 2, in the Nekizan Nichiroku journal describing how moved he was by the extraordinary beauty of chrysanthemums.

=== Rikka style ===
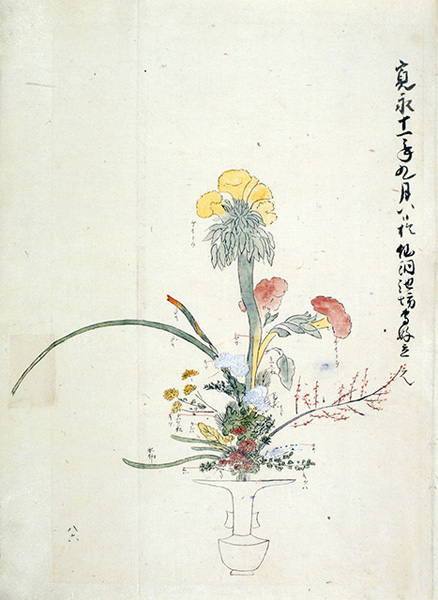
Rikka arrangement by Ikenobō Senkō II (from Rikka-no-Shidai Kyūjūsanpei-ari, Important Cultural Property)

From the late Kamakura period to the Muromachi period (late 13th -16th century), flower arranging contests were held at the imperial court on the day of Tanabata (the festival of the star Vega, the seventh day of the seventh lunar month). These contests were called Tanabata-e . Aristocrats and monks vied with each other in demonstrating their skills, offering flowers in honor of the festival.

Use of the family name Ikenobō was granted by the Emperor of the time. Succeeding generations of head priests of the temple used this name.

Toward the end of the Muromachi period the earlier simple way of setting flowers in a vase developed into tatehana (tateru, standing; hana, flowers), a more complex style of ikebana. During this period the oldest extant manuscript of ikebana (Kao irai no Kadensho, 1486) and the famous manuscript about ikebana by Ikenobō Senno (Senno Kuden, 1542) were written. Senno, the founder of Ikenobō kadō, originated ikebana that was imbued with meaning (kadō or way of Ikenobo flowers). Previously, tatehana had more of a connection to the spiritual practice of Yorishiro.

The Azuchi-Momoyama period (late 16th century) brought a renaissance in ikebana as part of a cultural renaissance. Two Ikenobō masters named Senkō I and II, completed the rikka (立花) style (also meaning standing flowers, but with more complexity than tatehana) and Ikenobō reached a high point of its early history. Paintings depicting the rikka of Senkō II, a famous master of ikenobō, are preserved at the Manshuin Temple in Kyoto, the Yomei-bunko library of the Ninnaji Temple in Kyoto, the Tokyo National Museum and the library of ikenobō headquarters. The arranging of rikka as a style with severn main parts later developed into the modern standard nine part rikka (shin, soe, uke, mikoshi, nagashi, doe, hikai, maeoki, and shoe-shin) was established at this time.

After Senkō II died, rikka gradually became more complex and mannered. The birth of the shōka style of ikebana brought new interest into the world of ikebana. After his death, an at times violent feud broke out between his two main disciples Daijuin Ishin and Anryūbō Shūgyoku about the direction of the school.

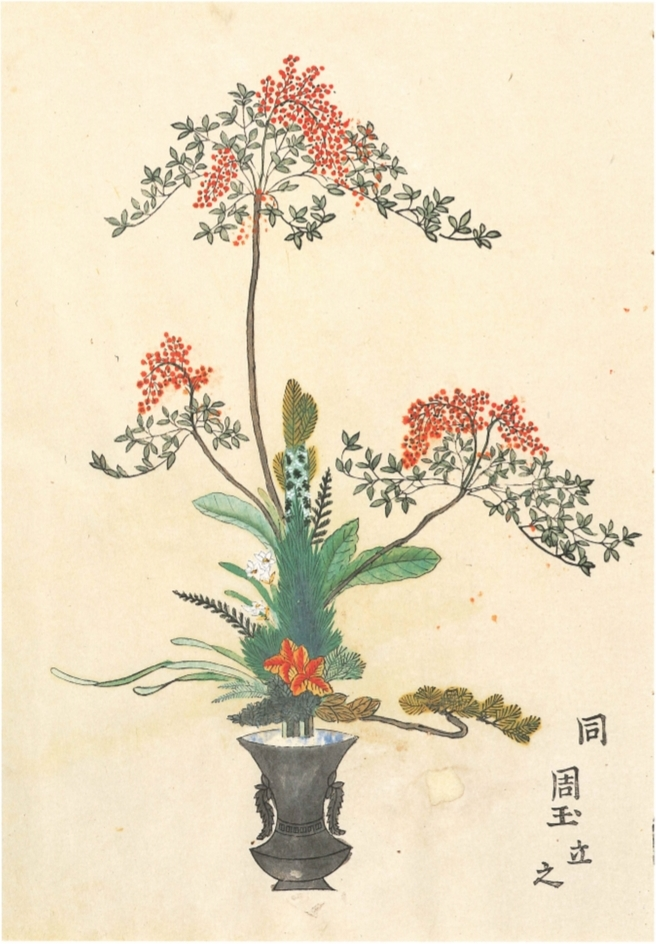
Rikka arrangement by Shūgyoku (from Rikka-zu narabini Sunamono-zu)

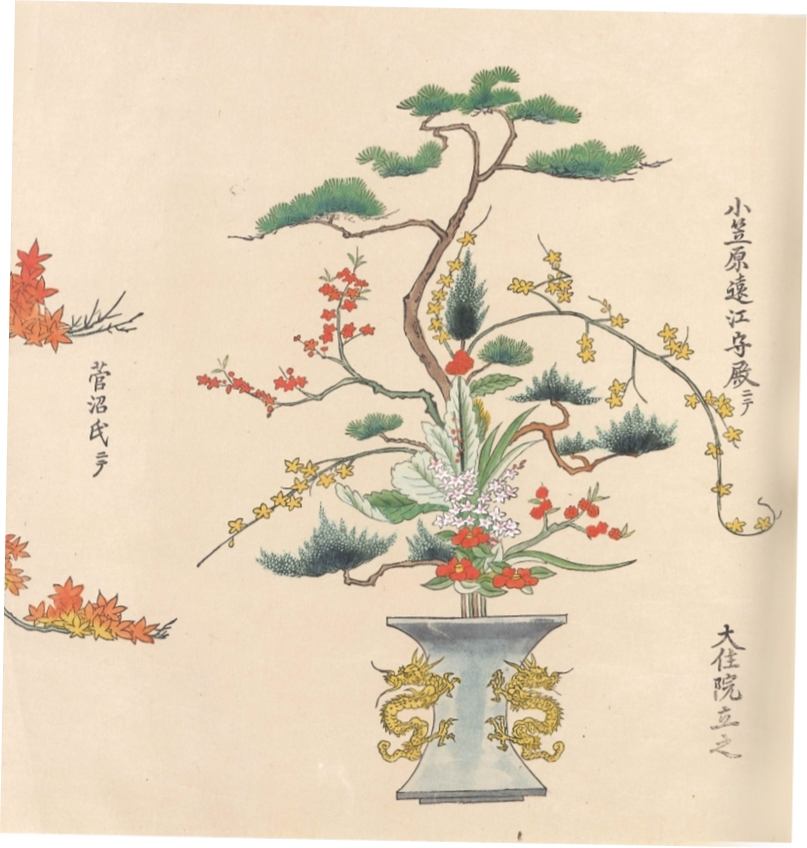
Rikka arrangement by Daijuin (from Daijuin Rikka Sunamono-zu)

=== From Nageirebana to Shōka style ===
Nageirebana (投入花), a more informal style of arrangement, had been practiced even during the earlier period when rikka was developing. Nageirebana was a style of decoration for the zashiki, while rikka, the most formal style, was used for rites and ceremonies. The townspeople favored nageirebana, which presented the natural beauty of flowers without complicated rules.

In 1684, Toichiya Taemon, a merchant, wrote the Nageire Kadensho (How to arrange flowers in Nageire style), and in 1697, Kodai Shōka Zukan (Collected Paintings of Historic Shōka Works) by Ikenobō Sen'yō was published. Nageire influenced the development of early work in the shōka (生花) style. Shōka at this time was very simple. Only two main branches (or flowers), one of which was called in (negative) and the other yo (positive), were used in arranging the work. These would later develop into three main parts, called shin, soe and tai.

The shōka style developed over a long period, with many schools of ikebana other than Ikenobō appeared. Shōka was firmly established in Ikenobō Senjo's work Soka Hyakki (One Hundred Examples of Ikebana, 1820). He also edited Heika Yodo-shu, in which the traditional methods of rikka were described in detail.

In the Meiji era (1868–1912), Ikenobō Senshō set down the regulations of shofutai shōka, shofutai meaning orthodox or traditional style. Mannerism again began to appear. Efforts to break away from mannerism were not successful until the Taishō era (1912–1926). The styles of modern nageire and moribana and modern styles of shōka were the result. These styles were influenced by the importation of European culture, beginning during the Meiji Restoration (1868).

=== Shimputai style ===
Shimputai, a new style of shōka, developed in 1977 by 45th generation Headmaster Ikenobō Sen'ei, presents a bright, modern feeling. Two main parts, shu and yo, respond to each other with contrasting yet harmonious qualities. A third part of the arrangement, ashirai, is often added as a finishing touch. Following a period of development of shimputai the new principals were also applied to Rikka and Rikka Shimputai has become popular in the twenty-first century.

=== Jiyūka ===
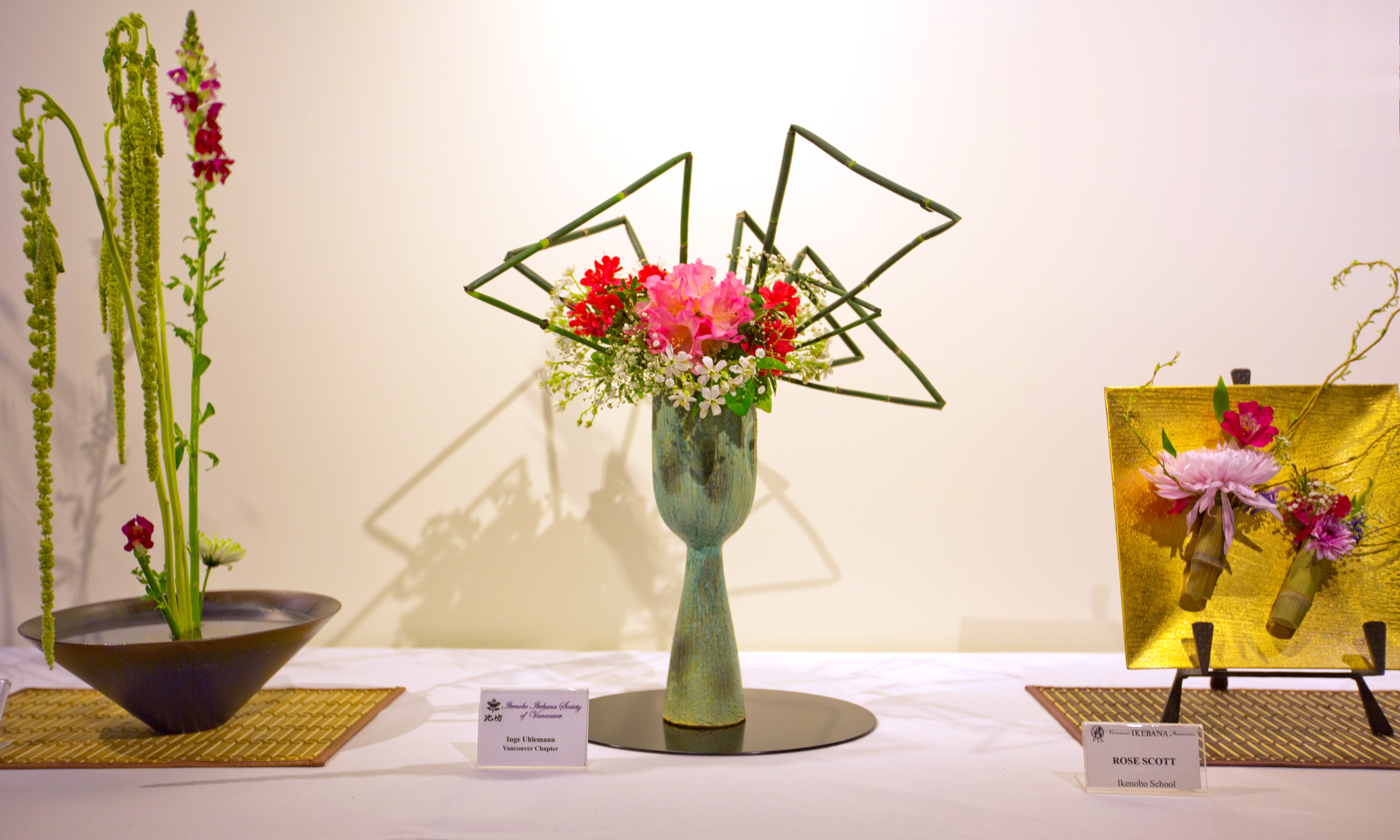
Jiyūka free style arrangements

Jiyūka is the free style. Although any kind of material and vessel may be used, certain guidelines should still be observed to give the arrangement a sense of balance and effect.

== Styles ==
There are three main recognised styles (様式):

- Rikka (立花)
  - Rikka Shōfūtai (立花正風体), traditional style
  - Rikka Shinpūtai (立花新風体), new style
- Shōka (生花)
  - Shōka Shōfūtai (生花正風体), traditional style
  - Shōka Shinpūtai (生花新風体), new style
- Jiyūka (自由花), free style

== Headmasters ==
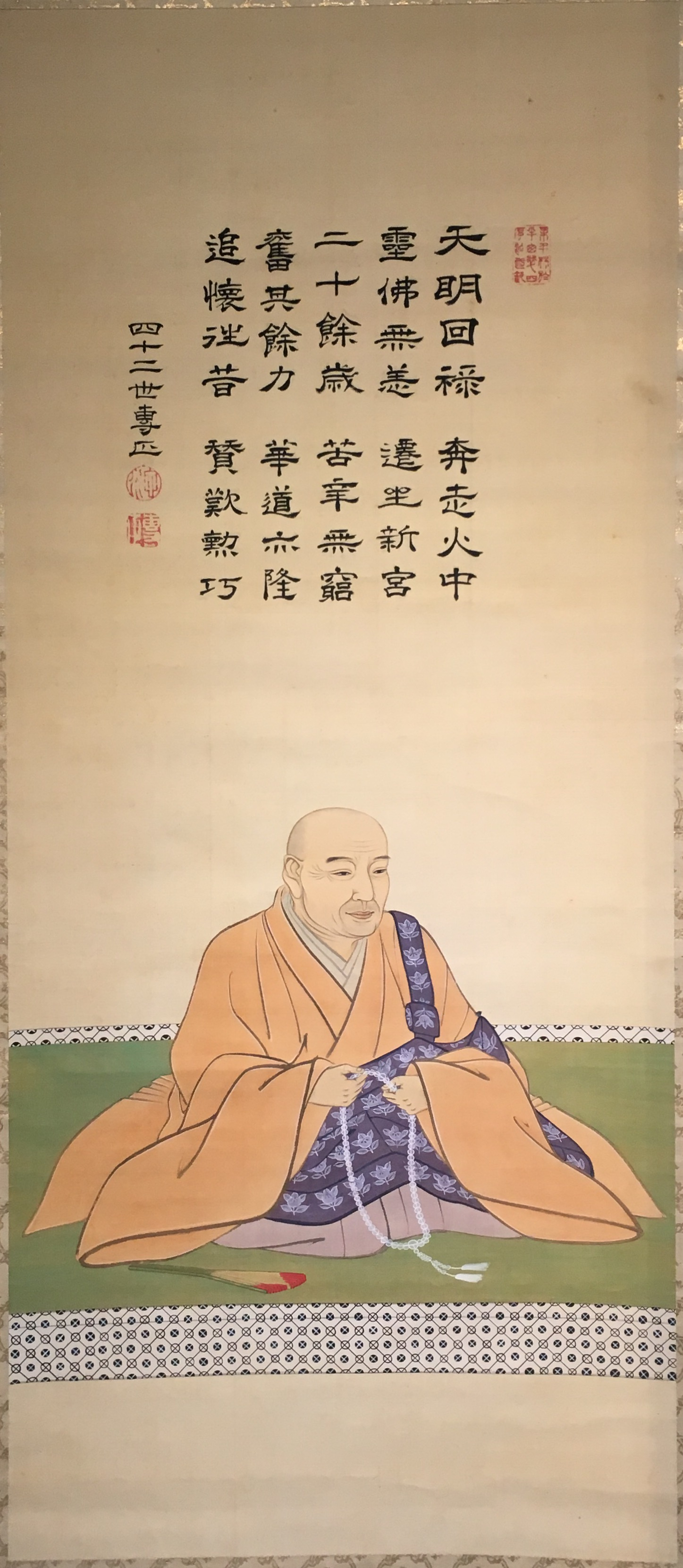
Ikenobō Senjō, depiction on a kakemono

The position of iemoto, or headmaster, has been hereditary in the male line in the Ikenobō family for centuries.

- 31st Ikenobō Senkō I (初代 池坊専好), 1536?-1621
- 32nd Ikenobō Senkō II (二代 池坊専好), 1575?-1658
- 33rd Ikenobō Senzon (池坊専存), ?-?
- 34th Ikenobō Senyō (池坊専養), ?-?
- 35th Ikenobō Senkō III (三代 池坊専好), 1680–1734
- 36th Ikenobō Senjun (池坊専純), ?-?
- 37th Ikenobō Sen'i (池坊専意), ?-?
- 38th Ikenobō Senjun (池坊専純)〔reappointed〕
- 39th Ikenobō Senkō (池坊専弘), ?-?
- 40th Ikenobō Senjō (池坊専定), ?-?
- 41st Ikenobō Senmyō (池坊専明), ?-?
- 42nd Ikenobō Senshō (池坊専正), 1840–1908
- 43rd Ikenobō Senkei (池坊専啓), ?-?
- 44th Ikenobō Sen'i (池坊専威), ?-1944
- 45th Ikenobō Sen'ei (池坊専永), b. 1933

Sen'ei Ikenobō is married to Yasuko Ikenobō. While they have several sons, their oldest child Yuki (池坊保子, b. 1965)) currently officially the Headmaster designate, will become the next headmaster under the name Ikenobō Senkō IV (四代目 池坊 専好), breaking with the previous tradition that only a son can be named as successor to be head priest at the temple.

== Headquarters ==
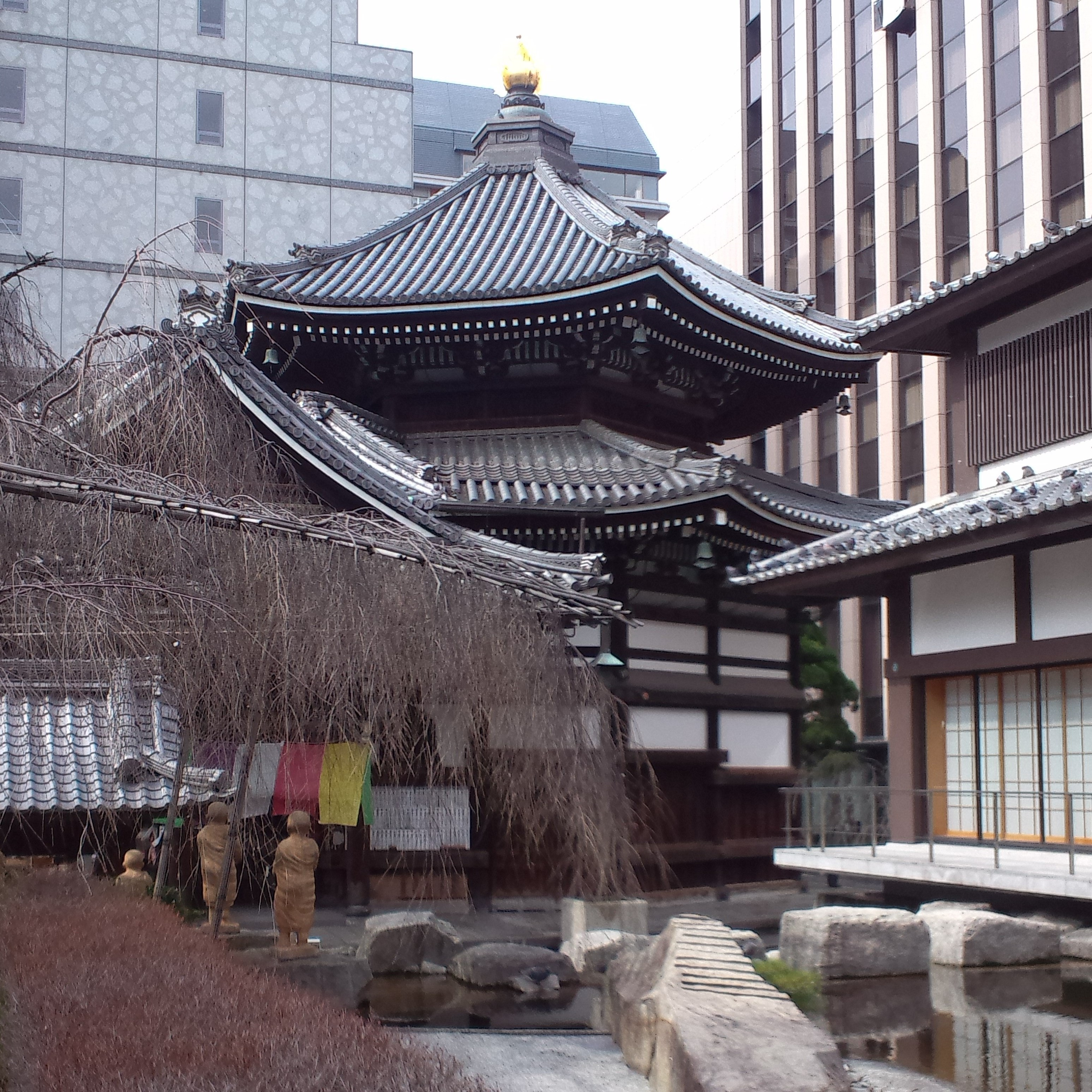
Rokkaku-dō temple in Kyoto, where Ikenobō originated from. Next to it is the dōjō and behind it the modern headquarters.

The dōjō is located next to the temple and is a two-storey structure built in the traditional style. It holds mainly exhibition space laid out with tatami mats and shoji sliding doors. Around it is a small water pond and garden. It has a large auditorium on the main floor and the museum is located there as well. It also contains exhibition space and classrooms and serves as a centre for communication, studies, and workshops for teachers and students, and a coordination point for local chapters or those wishing to found a new one. Chapters exist throughout the world.

== See also ==
- Saga Go-ryū, school also based in Kyoto
