= Saga Go-ryū =

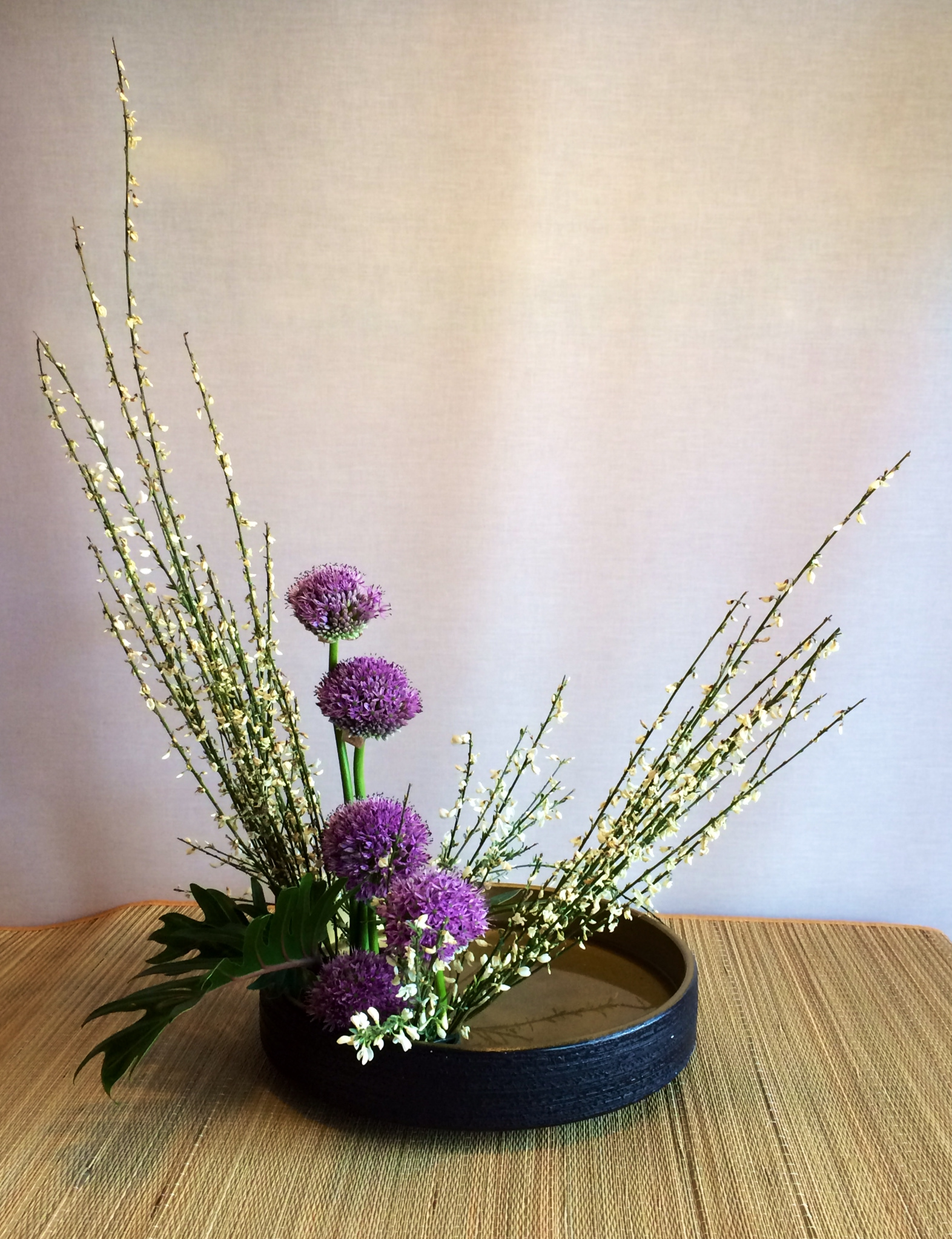
Moribana useitai style of Saga Go-ryū

Saga Go-ryū (嵯峨御流) is a school of ikebana, the Japanese traditional art of flower arrangement. The school is also known as Saga-ryū.

== History ==
The history goes back to Emperor Saga, who ruled from 809-823 CE during the Heian period. The emperor resided at a villa in Kyoto, and had a large pond with gardens arranged at it. This Ōsawa Pond is around 2.4 hectares large and is supposed to reflect the outlines of Dongting Lake in China, which has a special significance in Chinese culture. The style is known as chisen-shuyu, which is a garden meant to be seen from a boat, similar to the imperial Chinese gardens of the period. The lake was created by damming a stream which came from the Nakoso waterfall.

At the north end of the pond are two islands, one large and one small - the small island being known as Chrysanthemum Island. Between the two islands are several small rocky islets, meant to resemble Chinese junks at anchor. On a hillside north of the lake is what appears to be a dry cascade (karedaki), a kind of Japanese rock garden or zen garden, where a real waterfall is suggested by a composition of stones.

According to tradition, the emperor had chrysanthemums blooming on an island of the pond arranged to be presented at court.

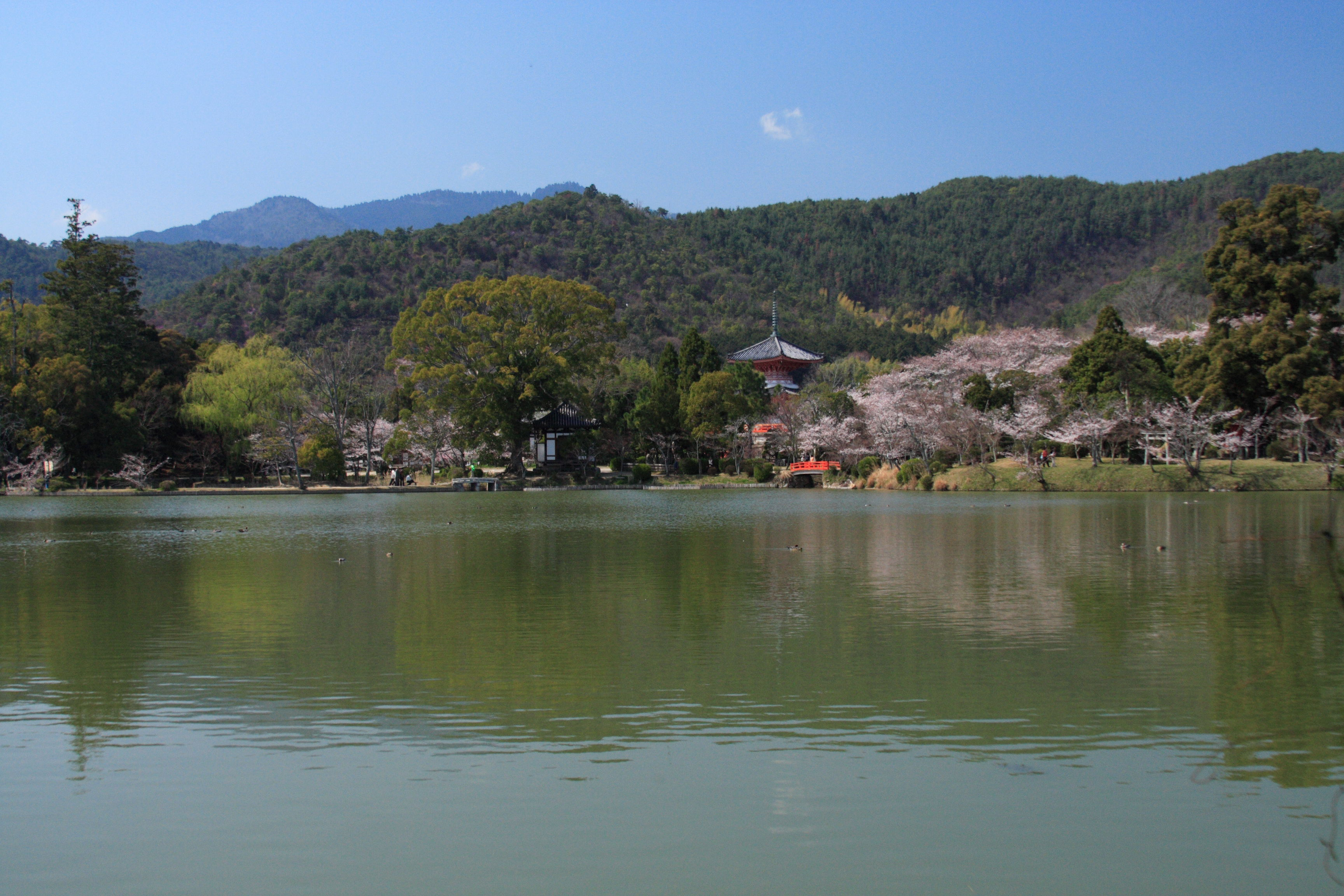
The Ōsawa Pond and surrounding garden Daikaku-ji in Kyoto. The pond and gardens play an important role in the arrangement style of the Saga school

The garden was celebrated in the poetry of the period. A poem by Ki no Tomonori in the anthology Kokinshū, described the Kiku-shima, or island of chrysanthemums, found in the pond.

I had thought that here
only one chrysanthemum can grow.
Who therefore has planted
the other in the depths
of the pond of Ōsawa?

Another poem of the Heian period, in the Hyakunin isshu, described a cascade of rocks, which simulated a waterfall, in the same garden:

The cascade long ago
ceased to roar,
But we continue to hear
The murmur
of its name.

The imperial villa was turned by Princess Masako, the daughter of Emperor Saga, into a Shingon Buddhist monastery named Daikaku-ji.

Tsujii Kōshū (辻井弘洲) (born 1872), who was one of Ohara Unshin's disciples from the Ohara-ryū, established his own school in the early part of the Taishō era. He was invited by Daikaku-ji to set up the Saga Go-ryū school in 1931. He published a number of books on the topic of ikebana, which were also translated into English and published in America even before the Pacific war. The headquarters of the Saga school has been located there ever since.

He was succeeded by his second son of Tsujii Hiroshu (辻井 博州). After the war ended, he taught ikebana to the wives of American troops stationed, and became a founding member of Ikebana International (I.I.), which was founded in 1956. He traveled to the United States as a cultural delegate to the Centennial of the Japan-U.S. diplomatic relations, touring the country for seven months. He worked as a demonstrator at I.I. chapters and world conventions around the world, contributing to the spread of traditional Japanese culture through ikebana.

He has been involved with the Japan Ikebana Art Association since its inception in 1966 as a councilor and director, and served as vice president in 1994. In 1991, he received the Order of Cultural Merit from the Governor of Osaka Prefecture and the Commendation from the Minister of Education. In autumn of 1998, he was awarded the Order of the Rising Sun, Gold and Silver Star, Fifth Class. He is married to Nomura Kei (辻井ケイ), whose father was the 54th head priest of Daikaku-ji. She is a professor of the Omotesenke tea school.

Their daughter Tsujii Mika (辻井ミカ) was born in September 1959. She succeeded her father as the 3rd head of the school on April 1, 2014.

The school has around 109 branches in Japan, and some 20 offices and branches in rest of the world.

== United States ==
Saga Goryu was established in Portland, Oregon by Daiyu Y. Henjyoji in 1940 as part of the Henjyoji Shingon Buddhist Temple Nippon Cultural Academy. In the late 1950’s both he and his wife, Mrs. Wako Henjyoji, were actively teaching, demonstrating, and holding ikebana exhibits.

After 1961, when Bishop Henjyoji became head of Jobodai-in temple at Koyasan, Japan, he divided his time between duties at Koyasan and the Portland temple. Rev. Wako Henjyoji remained in Portland at the temple and continued to teach Japanese cultural arts. In 1974, the school was designated Saga-Goryu North America Branch by Daikaku-ji temple. Even after the Bishop’s death in 2006, Rev. Wako Henjyoji continued as the leader of the North America Branch until 2011 when she designated David Shunko Komeiji as the next leader of Saga Goryu North America Branch, as recorded by Kyu Saga Gosho Daikakuji Monzeki Kado Shoshisho Daisosho Shimoizumi Kesho on January 1, 2011.

== Styles ==
The school draws from styles that have developed over the centuries. The emphasis is placed on the relation to Buddhism as the school is based at a temple. The traditional styles (伝承花) are:

- shōgonka (荘厳華)
- seika (生花)
- heika (瓶花)
- moribana (盛花)

The more modern shinshōka (心粧華) style consists of:

- inoribana (祈り花)
- sainohana (才の花)
- omoibana (想い花)

Shōgonka is the festive and formal style, which developed out of the religious ceremonies and reflects the esoteric Rokudai philosophy. Seika is the classical style based on the concepts of heaven, earth, and humans. It is viewed frontal and is placed in a tokonoma and is used for guests and ceremonies at home.

Heika and moribana are the free styles. They are based on the natural beauty of the temple, and are used either as chabana flower decoration for tea ceremonies, or bunjinbana, the poetic expression of one's emotion.

The newest style is shinshōka, which tries to demonstrate the basic essentials of Saga Goryū by using as little material as possible.

Stems are cut in water since it is believed that they hold longer that way, a method called mizu-kire. The school does not use the spiked kenzan flower holders, since it would be considered a form of unnecessary destruction to the plants, but shippo (七宝留めと), which are circular metal devices that fit into the vase or bowl and fix the stems by a number of holes that stems could be fit through for arranging.
