= Tamakazura =

Tamakazura (The Jeweled Chaplet) is a Noh play based upon the Tale of Genji and centered around the character generally known by that name, who was the daughter of Lady Moonflower.

One of the better-known of the many Noh plays that were based upon the Tale, The Jeweled Chaplet is considered to rank among the chief masterpieces of its creator, Komparu Zenchiku.

== Plot ==
A priest on a travelling pilgrimage joins a woman in a boat, who tells him the story of Lady Tamakazura, before requesting him to pray for her soul and vanishing.

Thereafter the ghost of Tamakazura appears before the priest, setting out and describing her bondage to love-attachment, before being finally set free by his prayers.

Using poetic imagery drawn from Renga, Komparu paints a picture of the heroine as passion's slave – something which significantly veers away from the more self-contained figure originally portrayed in the Tale of Genji.

== See also ==
- Hajitomi/Hashimoti
- Yugao
