= Nageirebana =

Style of ikebana

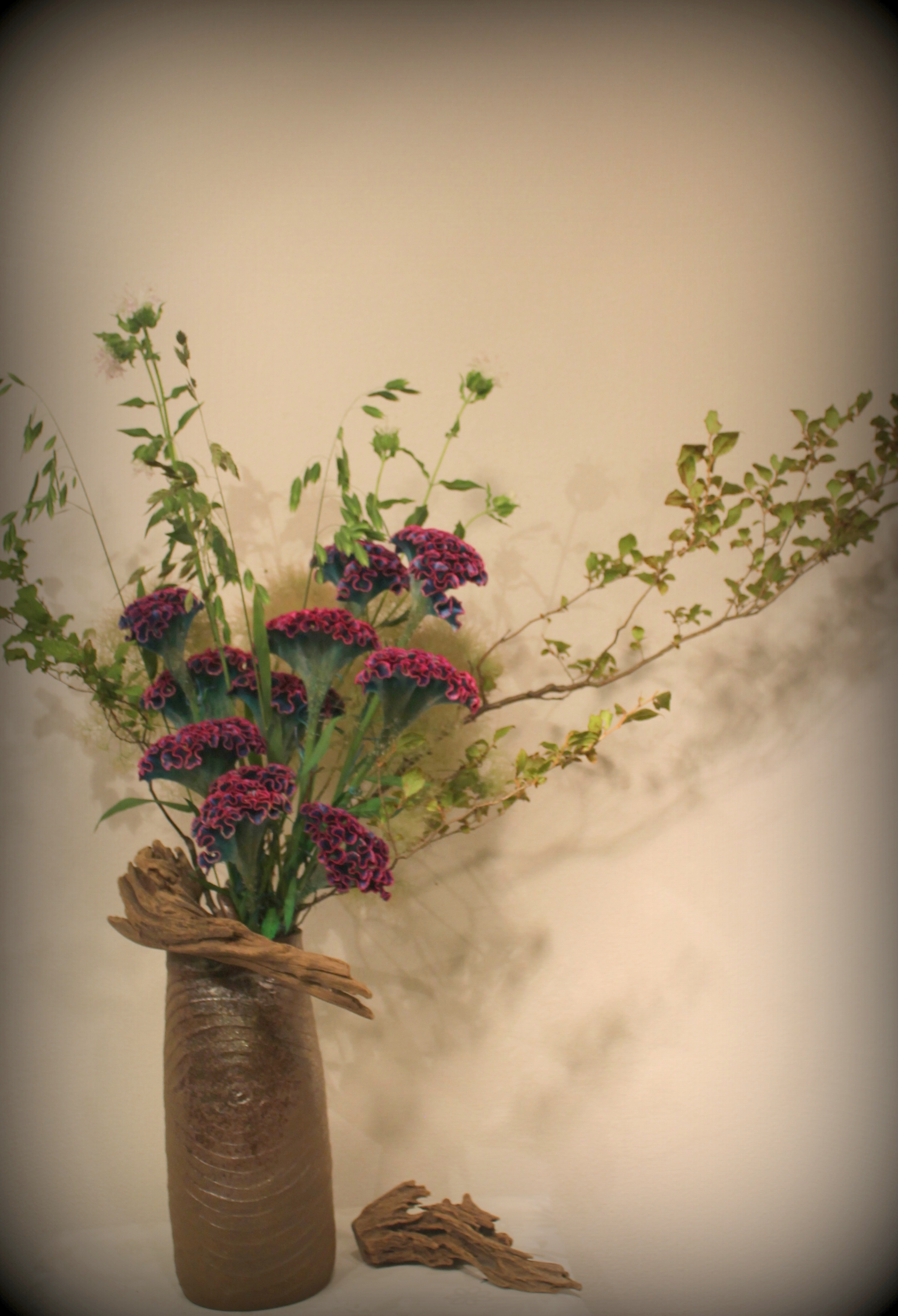
Nageire of the Banmi Shofu-ryū school

Nageirebana (抛入花), later also known as simply nageire (抛入 "thrown in"), is a style of ikebana. It is also known as Heika (瓶花).

== History ==
Nageirebana has its roots reaching far back to the beginning as a casual style of arranging flowers, in contrast to the more regulated Tatehana of Buddhist altars, which later evolved into the Rikka. It is associated with the later legendary story of a samurai. The legend states that a samurai, bored on a hot summer day, threw plant material into the small opening of a tall, deep vase on the opposite corner of the room. Thus this style received its name.

This form utilizes fresh and spontaneous designs that adhere only loosely to the classical principles of triangular structure and color harmony. Therefore, nageirebana is less formal than rikka, which was developing around the same time. Nageirebana was also practiced and around the time that chabana and seika were developing. Chabana is considered by some as another form of nageirebana since the principles of the casual style are similar. At some point later the term was shortened to just nageire.

Nageire is sometimes associated with moribana, and although the two styles share stylistic similarities, the historic development from each other is different, moribana having evolved later.

Many schools call the style nageire, however in the Mishō-ryū (未生流), Ohara-ryū (小原流) and Saga Go-ryū (嵯峨御流) schools it is called heika.

== Styles ==
- Nageire upright style is arranged in a narrow-mouthed, tall container without using kenzan or needlepoint holders. This is a simple arrangement that can contain just one flower and does not use frogs to hold the flower(s).
- Nageire slanted style presents a gentle touch and flexibility. It is ideal for beginners.
- Nageire cascading style arrangements have the main stem hanging lower than the rim of the vase. A flexible material will create beautiful lines balancing with flowers.

== See also ==
- Moribana
