= Banmi Shōfū-ryū =

School of ikebana

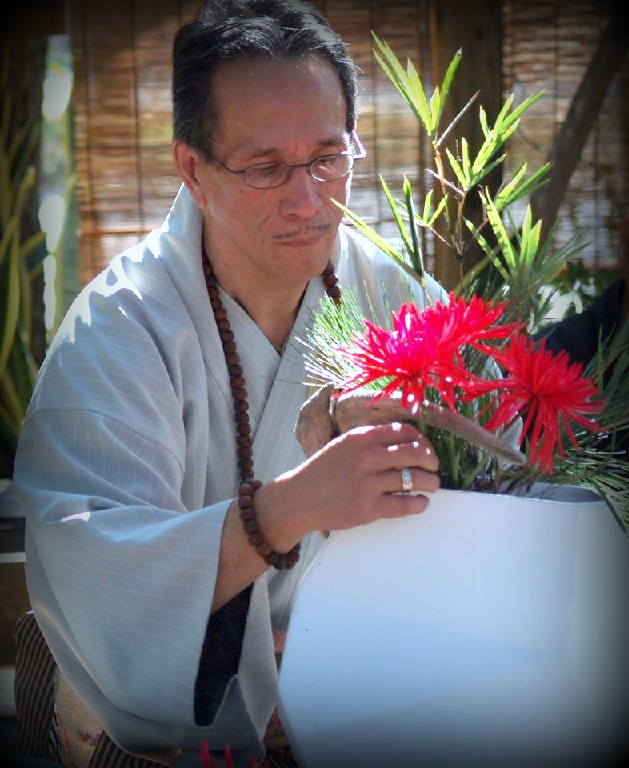
1. Dr. Ric Bansho Carrasco creating a Hashibana maru design during the 2009 Banmi Shofu memorial retreat at Shoshin Pottery Studio.

Banmi Shōfū-ryū (晩美生風流) is a school of Ikebana, a Japanese art form that involves arranging flowers, originally for spiritual purposes. Ikebana accompanied Buddhism's arrival in Japan in the 6th century and evolved from a Buddhist ritual. This practice, which started in India, consisted of throwing “floral offerings” to the spirits of those who had passed. By the 10th century, containers were used for the floral offerings, slowly representing the development of Ikebana. The word Kado, which means “way of the flower,” is used to refer to Ikebana practice and began to spread into more of an aesthetic than a spiritual representation during this time. By the 15th century, Ikebana embodied what it is known for today, an art form with a spiritual foundation. Ikebana has been shown to have calming physiological effects on both creators and viewers of the art.

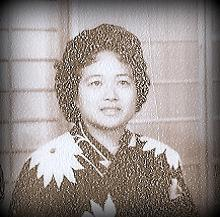
2. Vintage photograph of Bessie Banmi Fooks, the founding iemoto or headmaster of Banmi Shofu Ryu.

Banmi Shofu Ryu, like all schools, originated from Ikenobo, the first school of Ikebana. Bessie Yoneko Banmi Fooks, 1st Generation Headmaster and creator of Banmi Shofu Ryu, received her title in 1962 through the effortless and natural forms her Ikebana creations when she resided in Japan. Frequent visits to Kaohsiung Taiwan allowed Fooks to continue her studies and eventually earn her professor's certificate and authorization for the establishment of Banmi Shofu Ryu. Fooks began her teachings in Tainan, Taiwan and continued to exhibit and demonstrate her works in several countries around the world for over 50 years. Fooks characteristically used driftwood to connect her floral arrangements with their living spirit. In Banmi Shofu Ryu, driftwood is the essence of the Ikebana creations.

Before her passing, Fooks formed a flower relationship with Dr. Ricardo Bansho Carrasco and later named him 2nd Generation Headmaster (Iemoto) of Banmi Shofu Ryu. Bansho Ric-sensei implemented a 5-year plan for the formalization of his shared vision with Fooks, which until then had remained un-communicated to the community and only to the Fooks family In Japan and Hawaii. Formalization of Banmi Shofu Ryu included publication of books: Driftwood & Flowers, Telling Stories through Flowers, Banmi Shofu Ryu: From Samurai Beginnings to Contemporary Designs, and Banmi Shofu Ryu Kaden. A brochure and website were also published and several workshops, demonstrations, and exhibitions commenced.

The vision created by Bessie Banmi-sensei Fooks and Bansho Ric-sensei Carrasco viewed Banmi flowers, kado. In 1996, the curriculum was refined based on a Japanese manual of flower arrangement. Passed down by Bansui Ohta; this curriculum is now used as the basis for Banmi Shofu Ryu teaching. The overall purpose of this school is to demonstrate the art of Ikebana and to find new talent to promote and pass down the traditions of this fine art.

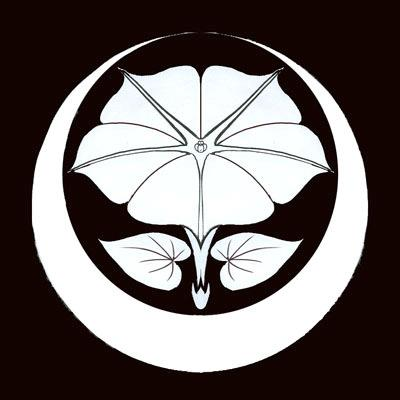
3. Ikebana schools, like Japanese families have a crest or a mon. Above is the Banmi Shofu Mon with the crescent moon and moonflower adapted by Jesus Bantake Minguez from instructions by Ric Bansho Carrasco and historical details from Bessie Banmi Fooks and Bansui Ohta.

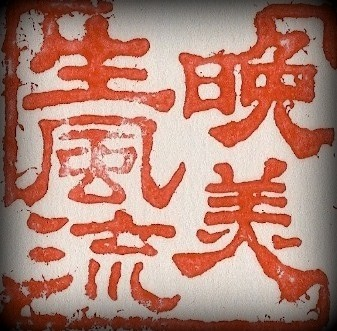
4. Signatures or marks of ownership in Japanese culture come in stamps and are called hanko. Above is the Banmi Shofu hanko which is the seal and signature for official documents like teaching and attendance certificates.

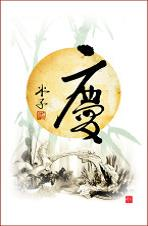
5. In 2004, Bessie Banmi Fooks commissioned Kevin Banes of Waialua, HI to create a graphic that depicts the images of Banmi Shofu Ryu, which included as shown in the above image, a rising moon, the word happiness in kanji, and the hallmark driftwood.

== Three Main Branches ==
Ikebana style greatly contrasts symmetrical and full western approaches. Every design in Ikebana is made up of three main branches, regardless of which school is used or the purpose of the arrangement. In Banmi Shofu Ryu Ikebana, the three main stems are Shin, Soe, and Uke. Their measurements are all based upon the size of the container. The angle and length of the stems are an important part of deciding the style of the arrangement for traditional designs. When a cascading or slanted arrangement is made, the stems will not fall in the same way as traditional styles, making some of the shorter branches appear taller than the longer branches. Shin is the first stem and it is based on the diameter plus height or depth of the container times one and a half. Soe is the second stem, and it is two thirds the length of shin. Uke is the third main stem, and it is one third to two thirds the length of soe. There are also two other stems used in Ikebana, but they are not considered to be main stems. Jushi are assistant stems, which are shorter than the main stems they support; and any amount of jush can be used in an arrangement. Ashirai are filler stems at the bottom and provide support for the main and assistant stems.

Stems are placed at certain angles in arrangements, since space is a very important element of Ikebana design. Shin is 10-90 degrees within the 180-degree arc. Soe is placed -40 degrees from 90 degrees of a 180-degree arc to the front side of shin. Uke is -70 degrees from 90 degrees of a 180-degree arc on the side of shin, opposite of soe. These different arcs allow for the design to be three-dimensional and act as a guide to allow for intentional space.

== Etiquette ==
An important aspect of Ikebana is the meditation within the therapeutic process of arranging. Therefore, it is essential to know the proper etiquette required for an effective experience. The class has many rules enforced to help everything come into focus and quiet the room where Ikebana is taking place. The significance of this etiquette is to show respect toward the sensei and to avoid disrupting other deshi. The sensei will guide the class to start after meditation; and at this time, participants are obligated to stop conversing and sit. The sensei is the teacher and head of the class and it is important to express respect to him or her. The sensei decides by need rather than speed; therefore, an arrangement is not finished until the sensei approves the piece. The sensei can readjust and dismantle an arrangement to fit the lesson. Participants must not express grievances in the classroom, as to avoid offending the sensei. Additionally, participants should record notes of the critique. Students are not allowed to critique others, talk during the arrangement process, or stand and walk around the room. Participants must follow the sensei after each arrangement inspection. If there are questions, students must raise a hand, though it is not uncommon for only an assistant to have permission to interrupt the sensei. The sensei will end class when everyone has been critiqued. At this time, students will report back to their seats and assist with cleaning the space.

== Equipment ==
There are older, traditional plant holders that may be used or one of the following modern counterparts can be selected: Pinpoint Holder, or kenzan, which is a steel or lead block with sharp points for use with thick and soft stems; Turtle Holder, or kame-dome, which is glass, metal, or actual turtle shells with holes made for stems; Crab Holder, or kani-dome, which is comparable to Turtle Holder, but with crab instead; Whirlpool holder, or kazesui-domei, that has two oblong shapes that are attached to imitate swirling water; and Tripod, or gotoku-dome, which is used to keep a kettle over a hibachi stove. Other plant holders include bundled straw or water lily stems, or komi-wara, which are utilized for portable arrangements, and another holder similar to komi-wara, florist oasis, which is a light foam usually used commercially. A Branch Holder, or kubari; Horse-Bit Holder, or kutsuwa-dome; Circle Holder, or shippo; and Slatty Holder, or yaen-kubari, may all be used to keep the arrangement in place.

== Major Designs ==
In order to develop the technique essential for creating designs that utilize an assortment of materials, the artist must first practice standardized styles. The classic standard Banmi Shofu Ryu designs are Moribana, Nageire, Chabana, Oseika and Gendaika. Ric Bansho also introduced a modern designed called Hashibana which comes in three expressions. These expressions are Maru (Global or spherical), Uate (tall and narrow) and Saba (low and narrow). Technical points that an artist needs to focus on when creating a design are: the length of the stems, degrees of slant, intentional space to be used, number of sections in the container, and whether the arrangement will be right or left-sided. Moribana, Nageire Keishatai, Oseika, and Banmi Shofu Chabana are only a few of such designs. Each design has its own characteristics, using particular flowers and specific arrangements styles, which may be appropriate for a certain environment such as a tearoom. The balance of the plants and flowers, combined with the appropriate container and spirit of the materials, creates a beautiful composition, which incorporates the naturalness of each design.

=== Moribana ===
Moribana is one of the classic expressions of Banmi Shofu Ryu. The word Moribana means "piled up flowers". Moribana uses one or more clusters of arrangements in kenzan to replicate how water plants grow and how creatures move around in natural ponds. Choice of materials and how much water shows in front, side, or back reflects the passing of the season. For example, more water is placed to the front during Spring and Summer. This style was introduced by Unshin Ohara around 1890 after the Meiji restoration of 1868. Moribana is not only an expression of Unshin Ohara’s creative departure from Ikenobo, but was also a strong sign of the Western influence in Japan. While distinctly a hallmark of the Ohara School, moribana has become one of the classic forms learned and created by Ikebana practitioners regardless of school or style affiliation.

A proper Moribana design uses a flat, shallow container, sometimes referred to as suiban (shallow trays), which allows for the spreading of floral and line materials sideways and away from the earlier classic vertical lines of the Rikka, Shoka,Oseika, and even Nageire. The complex design shown in Picture 1 is the definitive expression of Banmi Shofu Ryu, depicting the characteristic use of Filipino and Hawaiian driftwood in arrangements depicting nature. The entire composition tells a story. Here the two driftwood pieces, a hardwood and a bamboo, connect with each other representing friendship, and the tropical flowers accentuating the lines of the design with height, color, density, and position with other line and floral materials. The blue furoshiki (cloth used for wrapping gifts and items in Japan) represents the Pacific Ocean. Stories that come with Banmi Shofu designs can be expressed in haiku, and for this moribana kansuike, the haiku goes: Osawa calm through thousand years flower acceptance free there not here…

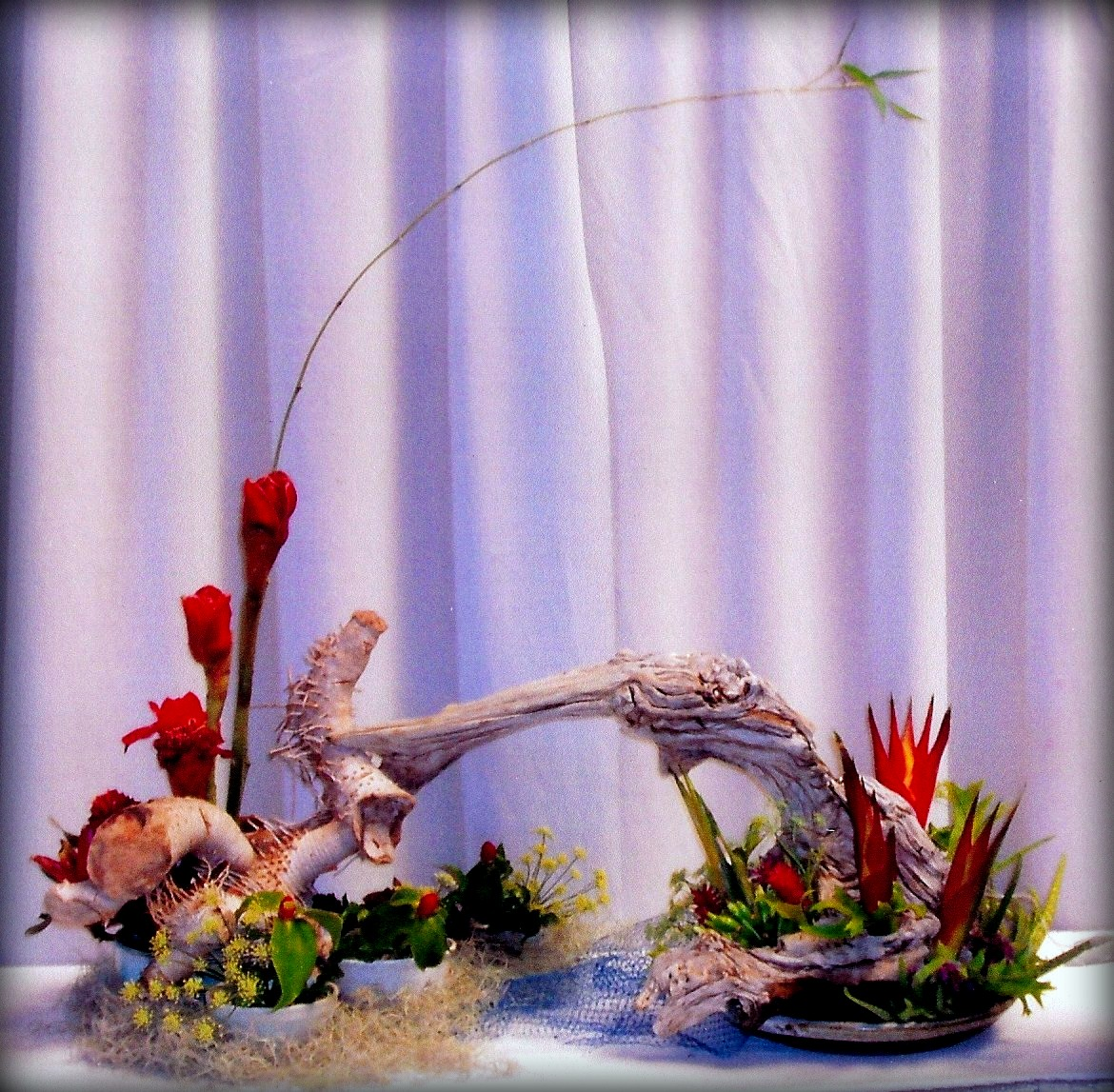
6.Double Moribana Hallmark Design, created by Bessie Banmi Fooks, 2001 for the Honolulu Hale, one of Hawaii's historical building which was originally called the Honolulu Municipal Building. Flowers used are: Alpinia (Tropical Torch Ginger), upright Heliconia, Costus Barbatus (Spiral Ginger), & Fennel; Line materials used are: Seaweed. & Bamboo Whip. Containers used are vintage (suiban or shallow containers) from Japan.

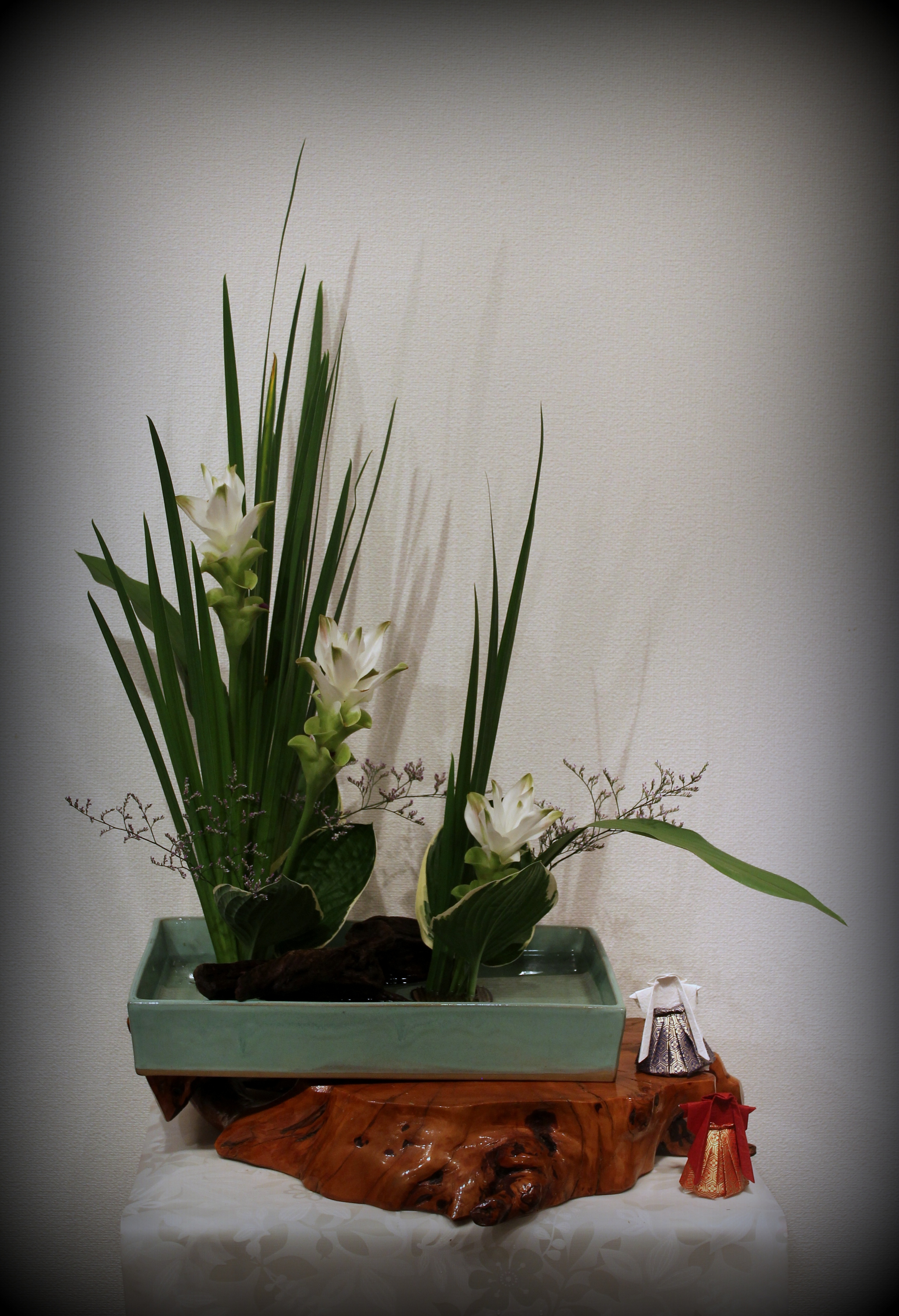
7.Moribana Kansuike, created by Ric Bansho Carrasco in 2014 during a demonstration held in Art Laksy in Tokyo, Japan. Container used is a classic celadon (suiban or shallow containers). Flowers comprised: Curcuma Petiolata (Hidden Lily, or Thai Tulip) and Limonium Altaica Montana (Limonium). The line materials were African Iris Blades & Variegated Hosta, and the driftwood from Okinawa. The stand is a polished Cypress cutting board. Other material used for the design are two samurai origami artifice as a tribute to the samurai founder of Shofu Ryu, the parent school of Banmi Shofu Ryu

=== Nageire ===
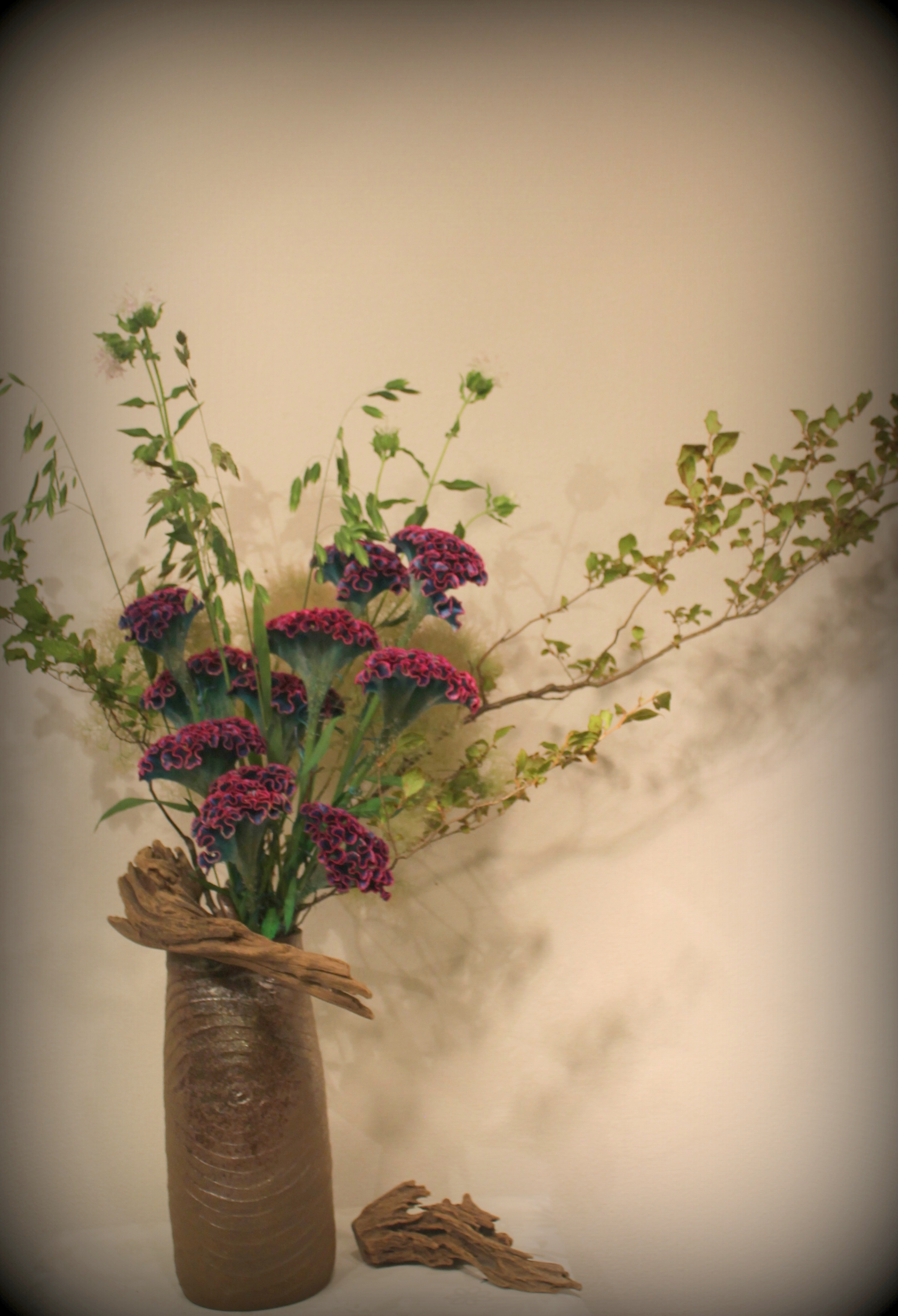
8. Nageire creation by Ric Bansho in 2014 during a demonstration in Art Laksy in Tokyo Japan. Line and floral materials include are common hedges in Japan with Celosia or Cock's Comb. Matching double driftwood are from Okinawa. Container is from the collection of Kimie Yangisawa, Sogetsu Riji and Banmi Shofu deshi.

Nageire, meaning "thrown in", is associated with the legendary story of a samurai. The legend states that a samurai, bored on a hot summer day, threw plant material into the small opening of a tall, deep vase on the opposite corner of the room. Thus this style was named Nageire. This Ikebana form utilizes fresh and spontaneous designs that adhere only loosely to the classical principles of triangular structure and color harmony. Therefore, Nageire is less formal than Rikka, which was developing around the same time. Nageire was also practiced and around the time that Chabana and Shoka were developing.

=== Chabana ===
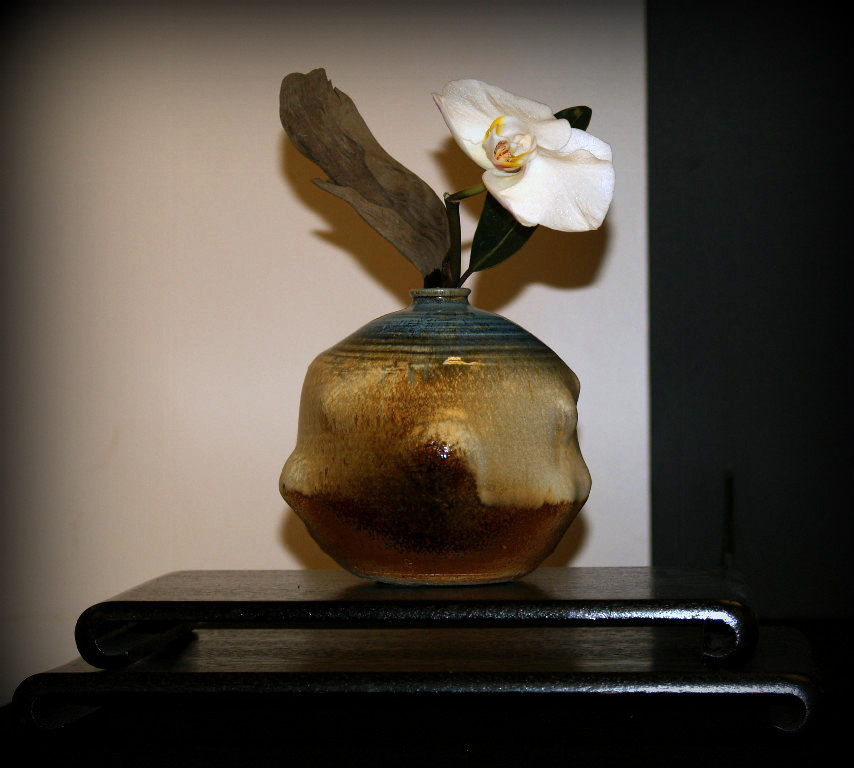
9. Chabana design by Ric Bansho Carrasco in a Shoshin Pottery chabana pot created in Guang Ming Temple during a demonstration in 2012. The double mahogany bentwood stands is the traditional indication that an ikebana headmaster of iemoto created the design standing on them. Solitary flower is a Phalaenopsis with a magnolia leaf and a Waialua driftwood.

Banmi Shofu Ryu Chabana uses a single flower, maybe a branch, but always employs the use of driftwood to support or to emphasize line or to create a dramatic impact. Although simple and elegant, chabana has deep roots in the traditions of the more formal Ikebana forms, and has its place in both the minimalistic Shintoism and the austentatious Buddhism expressions. Cha means tea, and bana originated from hana meaning flower. This style comes with minimal rules and appeals to those who prefer a simple, natural look in their creation. Banmi Shofu Chabana is the standard style for chanoyu or the Japanese tea ceremony. Chabana, in all its simplicity, requires much skill. Favored flowers are camellias and magnolias, but other less classical and seasonal flowers may be used. A true chabana will evoke the season of the year or take the viewer to a peaceful spot in the woods. Bronze, ceramic, bamboo, or glass containers are usually small to fit easily on a tea ceremony table. When creating a chabana, the artist selects the container and the driftwood based on the seasonal flower and line material (if appropriate), thinking ahead that no kenzan or kubari are used. Chabana designs are appropriate outside the tearoom, such as many places in the home.

=== Oseika ===
Seika style evolved as a simplified and smaller version of the Ikenobo Rikka, albeit more formal than the Nageire. Possibilities for variation were virtually limitless in relation to line and floral materials, as well as containers used. In 1766, a book whose title translates to, “A Look at Today’s Popular Seika Styles,” mentioned Shofu School as one of the popular schools of the time that had its own interpretation of the Seika style. The practice has continued to this day in creations in (moribana 'suiban' shallow containers) or tall Nageire containers. In Banmi Shofu Ryu, however, the style is referred to as Oseika (adding the "O" before Seika indicates respectfulness or honorable). Examples are in images below:

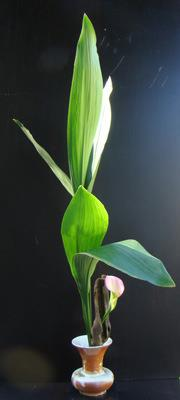
10. An Oseika design created in 2009 by Jesus Bantake Minguez during the Annual Memorial Banmi Shofu retreat at Shoshin Studios. The Oseika creation features five aspidistra leaves and a singular pink Calla Lily and Waialua driftwood in Shoshin Studios Nageire container

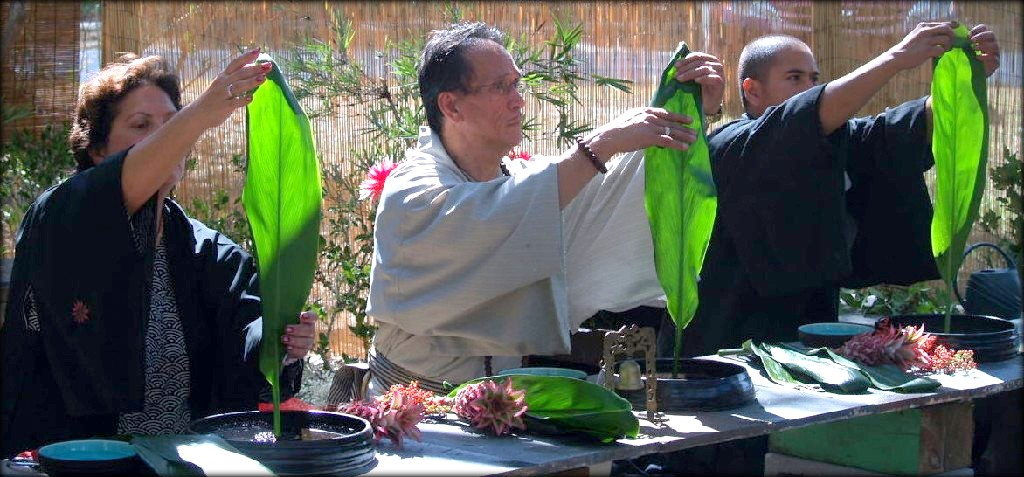
11. Synchronized Oseika called Kaze Odori (Dancing with the Wind), with Banbara Fooks, Ric Bansho Carrasco, and Jesus Bantake Minguez (holds the distinction of the first Banmi Shofu sensei certified by Dr. Ric Bansho Carrasco as 2nd Generation Iemoto. Kaze Odori is a formal performance, usually serving as the last number of a demonstration, where the sensei create an Oseika design synchronously, using the same exact line and floral materials, to the tune of a temple meditation bell and koto music, preferably.

=== Special or seasonal designs ===
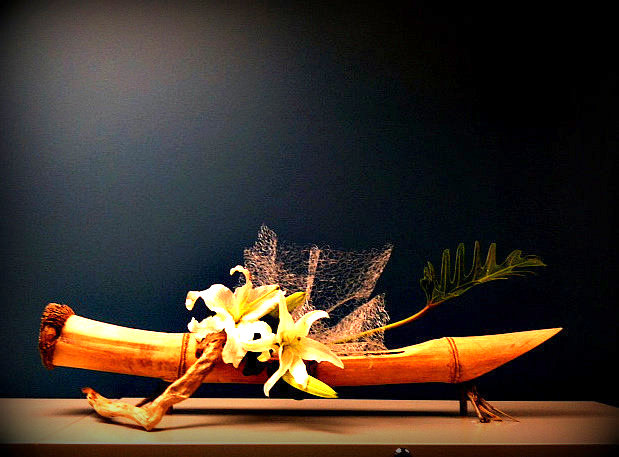
12. Iri Fune design on a lacquered elephant bamboo footed boat, with Lillium Asiaticum (Asiatic Lily, Siberian variety) and Philodendron Xanadu. Silken net fabric represents the boat sales, and Waialua driftwood serves as the oar. Created live during a demonstration during an Otsukimi festival, Guang Ming Temple, Orlando FL in 2010 by Ric Bansho Carrasco

Boat designs are used for departure or arrival wishes, adapted by Banmi Shofu Ryu from classic Ikenobo principles, and uses a boat-shaped container that may sit on a table or hang from a hook. The wish message is determined by the direction of the “oar” (nagashi) or a long sweeping material or branch. An oar that sweeps to the right of the viewer means a departing boat (De-Fune), and therefore a farewell or bon voyage wish. The opposite sweep direction indicates a welcome or a wish for a safe return (Iri-Fune). Placement of floral and line materials follow the same rules for shin, soe and uke branches. Note that whether or not the boat is hanging or sitting on a surface, the arrangement should be at eye level so that the water cannot be seen. Otherwise, this will suggest a leaking boat. Sato, S. (2012). Ikebana: The art of arranging flowers. Tuttle Publishing.

=== Morimono designs ===
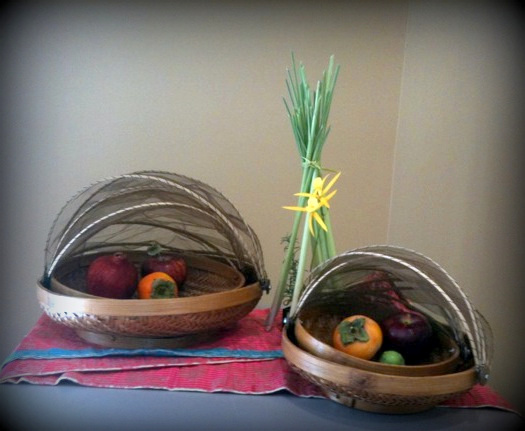
13. Morimono of persimmons, pomegranate, lime and red plums accentuated by freestanding lemon grass stalks, rosemary, and Yellow Brassavola Nadosa orchid on in nesting Hawaiian food baskets with folding net covers set on vintage Nagoya obi. Created by Ric Bansho Carrasco for Leu Gardens, Orlando, FL 2010 for Ikebana International Orlando-Winter Park Chapter 132.

Morimono designs are relics of Buddhist traditions of laying flower and fruit offerings, especially during the harvest season. This is much like Thanksgiving in the United States, but instead of using a cornucopia or a horn of plenty, artists use an Ikebana container. Containers can be a basket, a wooden structure, a tray, or a typical suiban (shallow containers), or an upright container. Contemporary Morimono is typically designed with fruit, fruit and flowers, fruit and vegetables, vegetables, or vegetables and flowers. Morimono style captivates beauty through the use of minimum flowers and materials.

=== Gendaika or freestyle designs ===
Gendaika or freestyle Banmi Shofu designs provide opportunities for using flowers, line materials, and driftwood in creative ways without the constraints of rules that govern other more classical designs. However, the finished creation is not a random arrangement and massing of flowers. It takes sensitivity to forms, colors, and textures and the way that they combine into a beautiful design that touches the viewer both aesthetically and emotionally.

Gendaika requires repetitive practice in following rules of engagement using similar materials, containers, tools, and developing a blueprint in one's daily patterns, habits, and routines so that measuring proportions, trimming branches and leaves, insertion of stems into the kenzan can occur without much thinking. The participation becomes spontaneous, a medium of expression and mindfulness. This is consistent in the way most people learn – first comes exploration, then conformity or convergence, and divergence follows. In Ikebana, the deshi first needs to have explored materials, designs, and tools repeatedly in different variations and multiple times and settings. This allows for mastery, patience and creativity– the driving force of Ikebana.

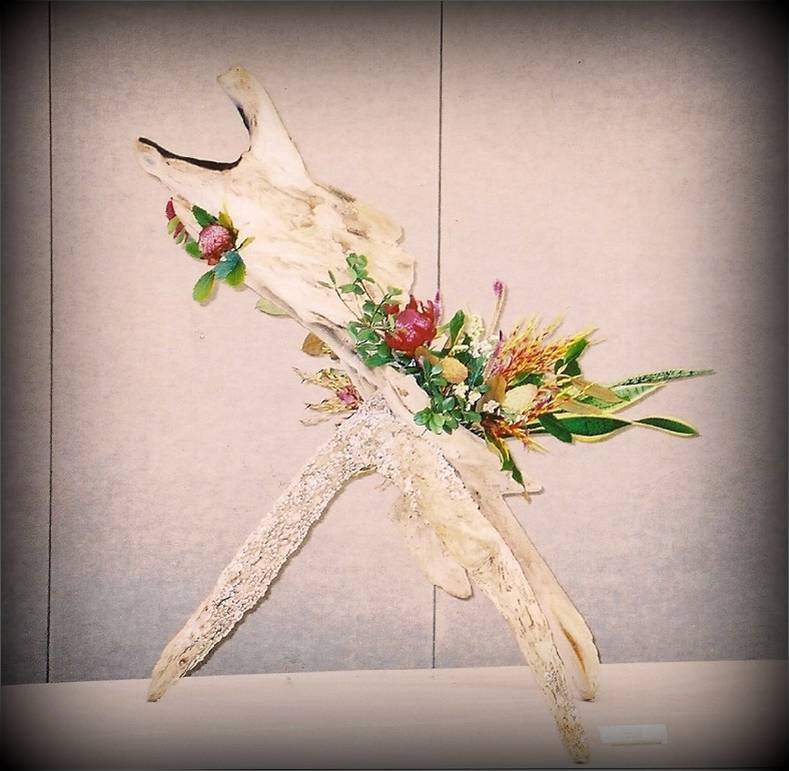
14. The above gendaika of freestyle Banmi Shofu design, created by Bessie Banmi Fooks in honor of the Year of the Horse in 2002 uses two large pieces of driftwood joined together as a free standing frame (the horse), for Queen Protea, Bromeliad blooms, Sanseverria, and Goodeniaceae, sp. Scaevola

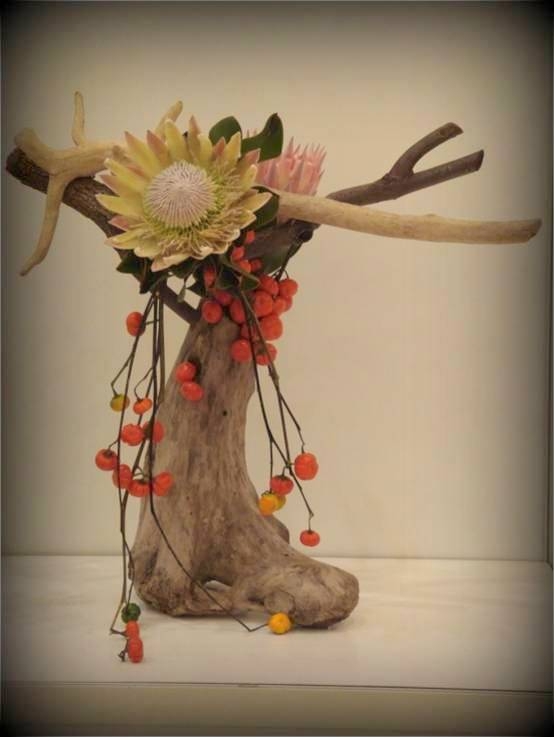
15. Gendaika creation in 2008 by Dolly Tu from Taipei, Republic of China using a combination of driftwood with contrasting colors and shapes holding two King Protea and strands of Chinaberry.

=== Hashibana style ===
Banmi Shofu Ryu Hashibana emerged in 2008 as a Banmi Shofu Ryu style. Tradition challenges a new headmaster or iemoto with establishing identity and consistency. Maintaining fidelity to the philosophy and kaden (rules of flower engagement) of the school, a new iemoto is required to project an identity that is distinct, yet identifiable with the school's style. Bessie Banmi Fooks' signature was the use of driftwood in all designs. Ric Bansho Carrasco's identity is associated with continuing that legacy in addition to the Hashibana style. Conceptually, the style is the symbolic bridge (hashi) of flowers (bana) between 6th century traditions and Ikebana of the millennium. It is the link between the classic styles that evolved through generations from the founding Samurai to contemporary designs.

Hashibana comes in three expressions: Hashibana Maru, Hashibana Uate, and Hashibana Saba. While there are specific rules in the use of flowers and line materials when creating the three expressions, the more obvious distinctions are in the containers used. Hashibana maru (round) uses globular, round containers with a smaller opening on top or on another part of the container. Hashibana uate (rectangular) use narrow, tall and wide containers. Hashibana saba use containers like Hashibana uate but are shorter, so they have the appearance of a long boat whether angular or rounded.

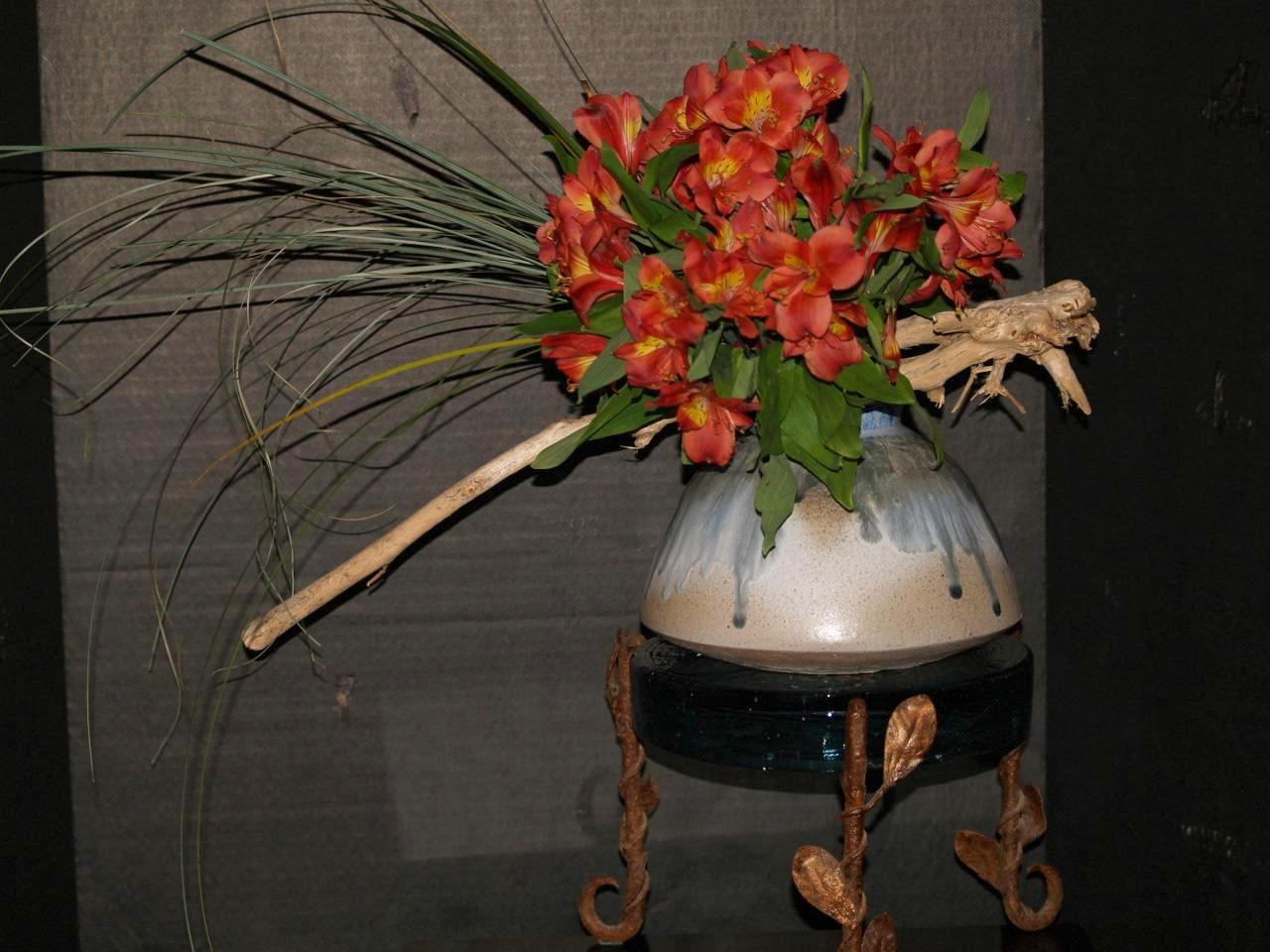
16. Hashibana Maru in Shoshin pottery classic container made for Banmi Shofu with fiery orange Astromelia, Bear Grass and St. John's River driftwood on an adapted glass candle holder and wrought iron stand. By Ric Bansho Carrasco, 2010 created live for the Tampa Garden Club demonstration

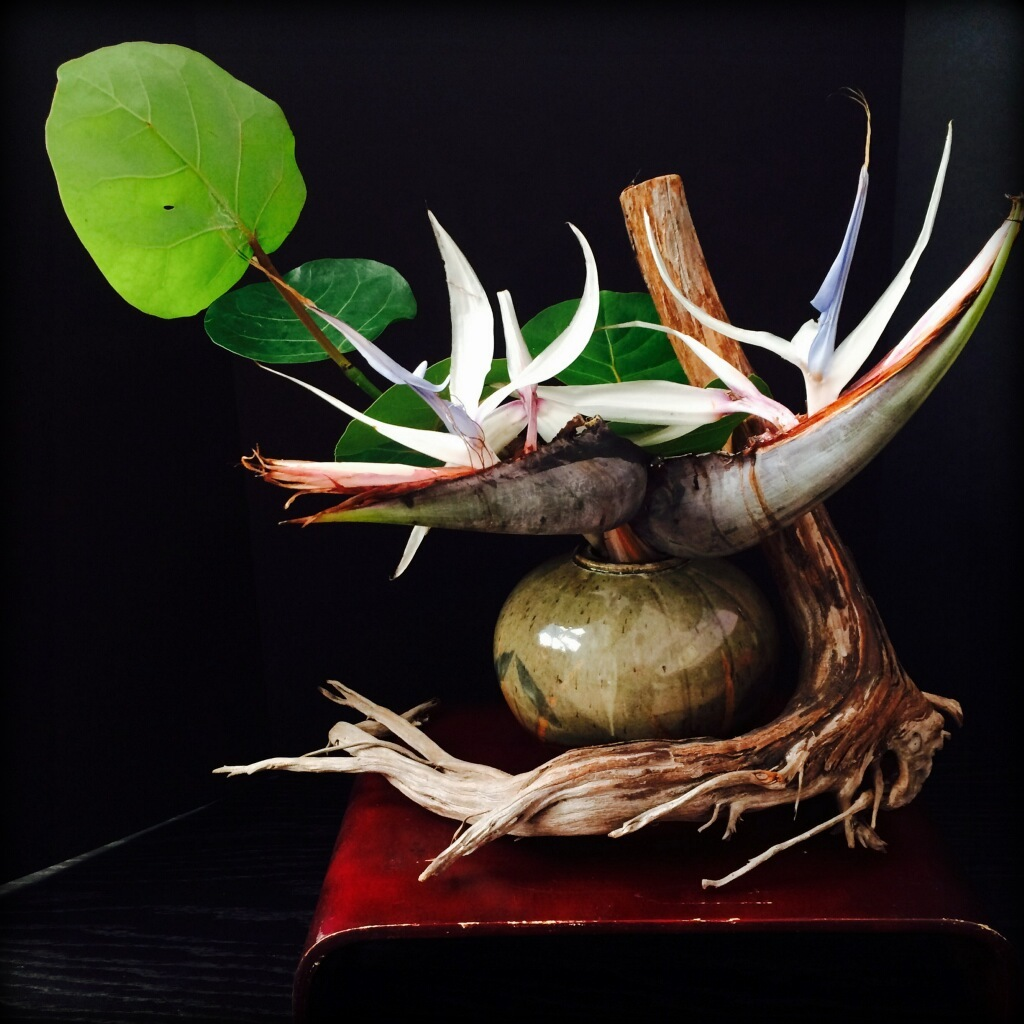
17. Another Hashibana design, this time created in 2014 by Banbara Fooks in a classic maru container with white Bird of Paradise, Seagrape leaves, and Hawaiian driftwood.

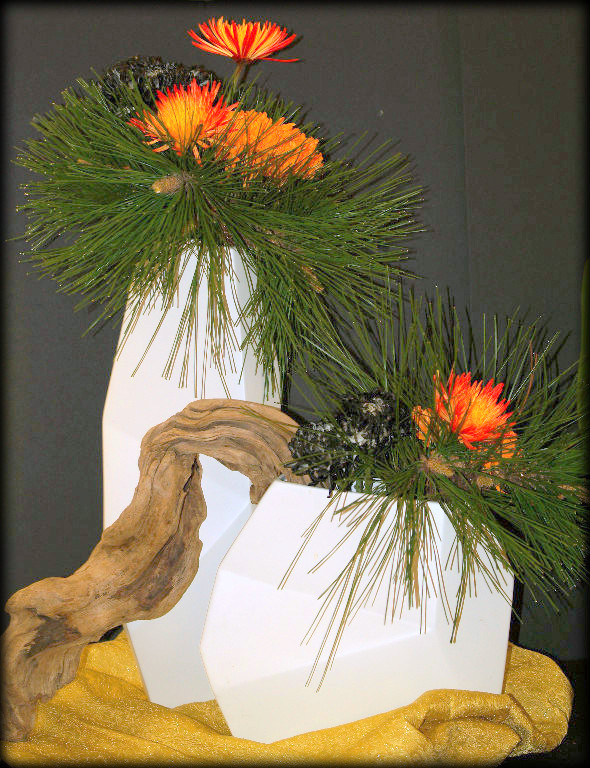
18. Double Hashibana Uate created live by Ric Bansho Carrasco in 2008 during the annual exhibition and demonstrations of Ikebana International St. Petersburg Chapter #65. Floral materials were orange and black Chrysanthemums with trimmed long needled pine as line materials. Driftwood from Alaska, and vintage gold silk brocade from Tokyo, Japan. Tall and narrow porcelain uate containers are from Z Gallery.

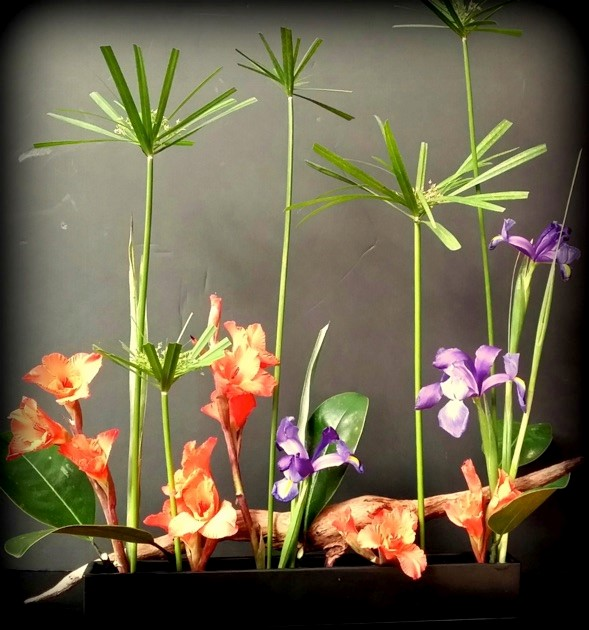
19. Hashibana Saba design is a combination of Dutch Iris and Gladioli with Papyrus and Magnolia leaves. Driftwood from Waialua, HI and classic container from the Daikakuji Temple in Kyoto, Japan. Created by Ric Bansho Carrasco during Epcot Flower and Garden Festival in 2014
