= Kenzan =

Device for holding flowers in an ikebana arrangement

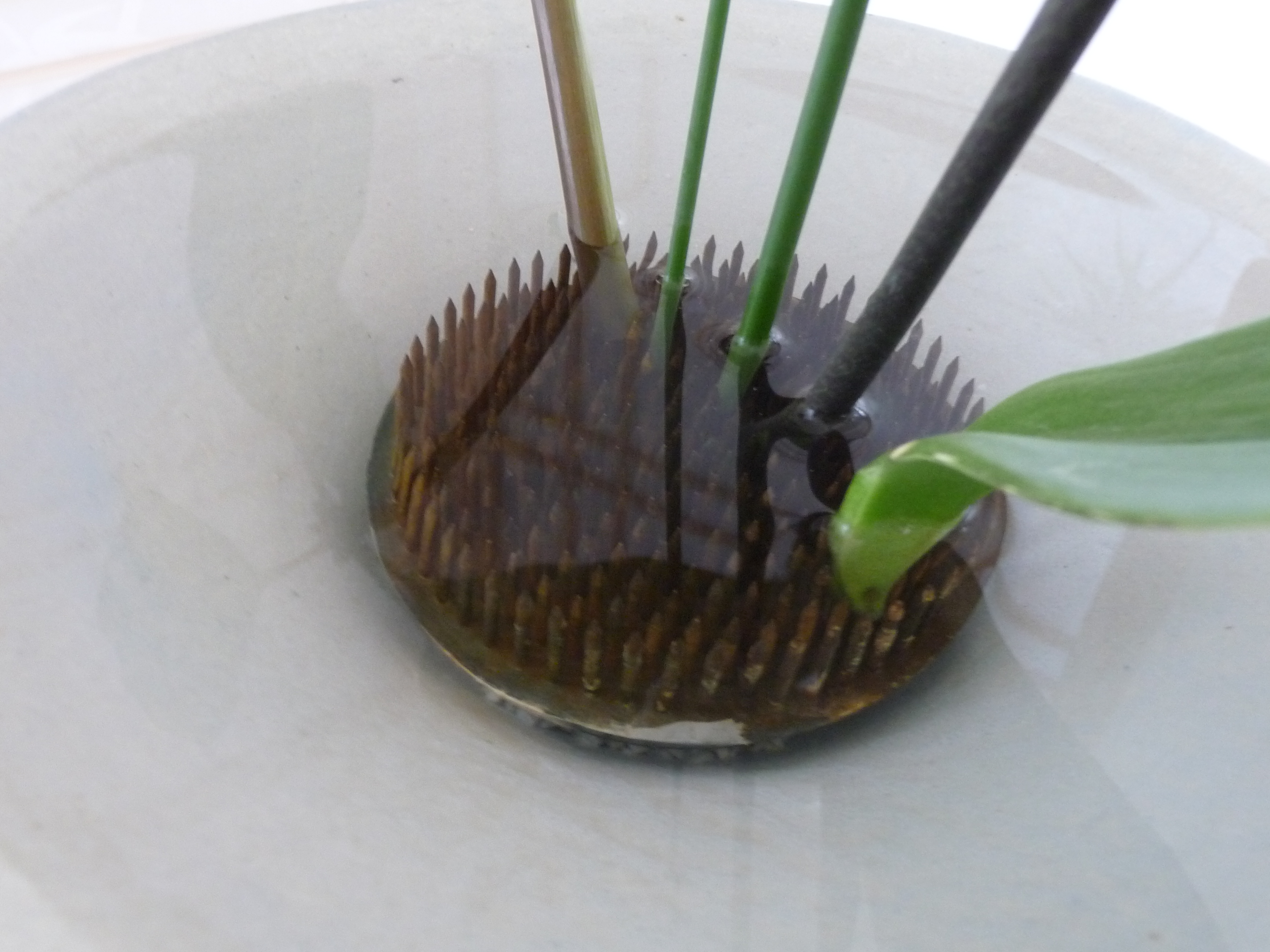
A kenzan used in an ikebana flower arrangement

A kenzan (剣山), also called a spiky frog or pin frog, is a device used in flower arranging (especially ikebana, or Japanese flower arranging) for fixing the flowers in the container. It consists of a heavy plate, usually lead, with erected needles often made of brass where stipes are fixed.

The name kenzan (剣山) literally means sword mountain. It was introduced for use in ikebana, especially the Moribana style of ikebana.

Another type of flower holder without spikes but only holes is called shippo dome (七宝留め) and is used by the Saga Go-ryū school and sometimes other schools of ikebana, as well as other kinds of flower arranging. These can be made from pottery, metal, plastic, or glass.

== See also ==
- Flower frog
