= Chabana =

Flower arrangement during chadō

Japanese name
- Kanji: 茶花
- Hiragana: ちゃばな
Transcriptions
- Revised Hepburn: Chabana
- Kunrei-shiki: Tyabana

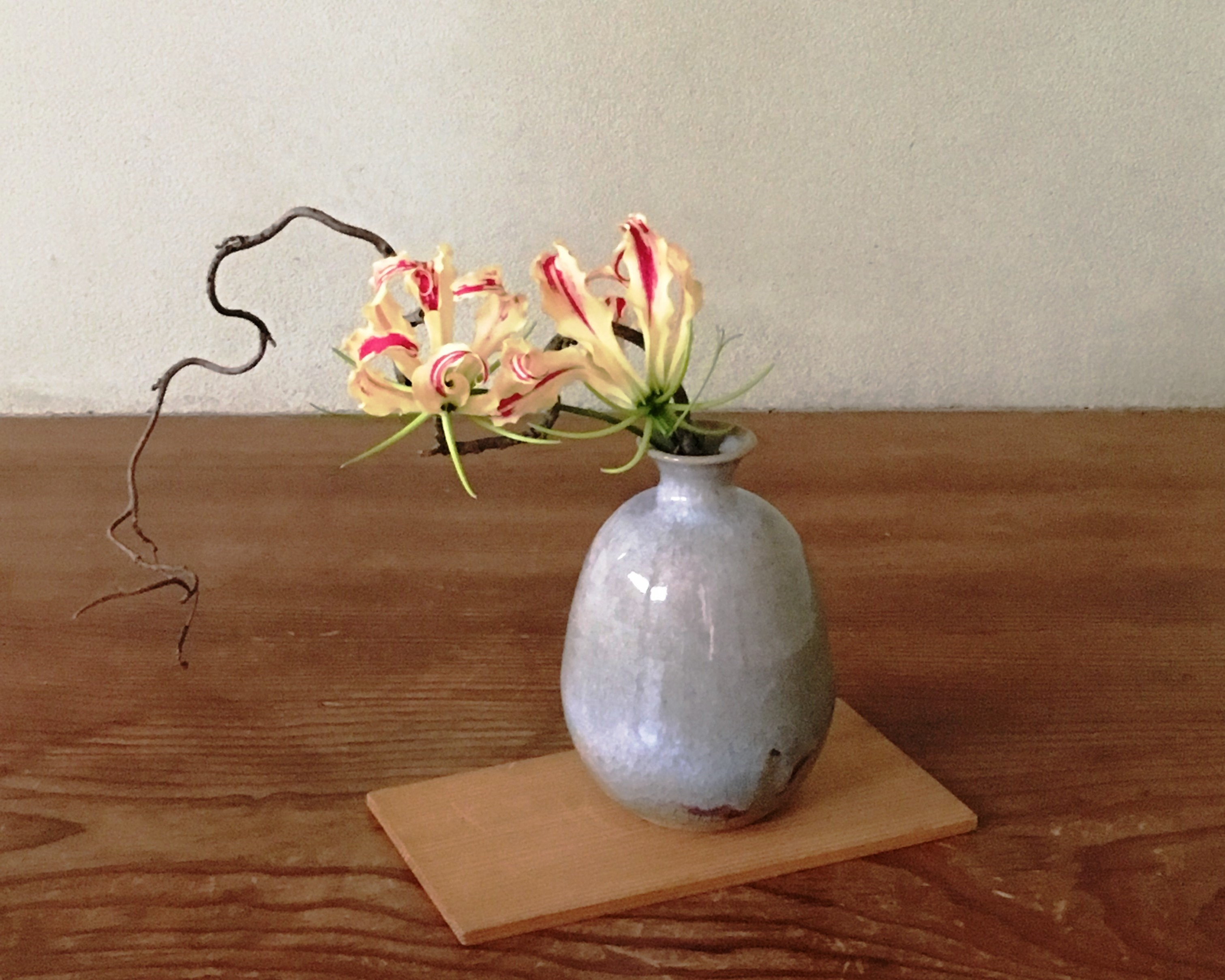
Chabana arrangement of the Sōgetsu-ryū school

Chabana (Japanese: 茶花; lit. 'tea flowers') is a generic term for the arrangement of flowers put together for display at a Japanese tea ceremony, and also for the wide variety of plants conventionally considered as appropriate material for such use, as witnessed by the existence of such encyclopedic publications as the Genshoku Chabana Daijiten [All-color encyclopedia of chabana]. The method of arranging the flowers is according to the nageire, or thrown in, style of flower arranging. In turn, nageire is recognized as a certain stylistic category of Kadō, the Japanese "Way of Flowers". These all developed from ikebana, which had its origin in early Buddhist flower offerings (kuge). Chabana, however, refers specifically to the flower display in the room or space for chadō, and though it fundamentally is a form of ikebana, it comprises a genre unto its own.

== History ==
The history of chabana follows hand-in-hand with the history of chadō, and within that historical milieu, chabana emerged in tandem with the rise of wabi-cha around the Momoyama period. Sen no Rikyū is considered the most influential person in the development of wabi-cha, and is also credited as the originator of the accompanying nageire mode of flower arrangement, which is characterized by freedom and spontaneity in expressing the natural beauty of the material. Among the statements attributed to him, the first one in the set of seven known as "Rikyū's Seven Precepts" (Rikyū shichisoku) concerns chabana. It goes, "The flowers [Chabana] should be such as they are in the moor." In the history of ikebana, the nageire style was added to the more stylized rikka arrangement around the end of the 1600s, as influenced by chabana. The term "chabana" was first used in 1765 during the Meiwa period. It is believed to first appeared in The Tale of Genji.

== Usage ==
Chabana can have a variety of uses depending on the styles of a certain tea ceremonies. In some cases, kakemono and flowers will be placed together or separately from tokonoma, and a pot of Japanese sweet flag was placed on the pot. Other than Japanese sweet flag, cammellia, plum blossoms, chrysanthemums, and daffodils is commonly used. There are some flowers that are prohibited, such as "western flowers". According to Southern Record, flowers of plants such as wintersweets and mountain mugwort, alongside strong fragrant flowers, and flowers from plants with thorns are generally prohibited.

== Stylistic traits ==
Chabana comes with minimal rules and appeals to those who prefer a simple, natural look in their creation. The arrangement is a seasonal expression of flowers placed in a simple vase or basket. It is intended to both heighten and deepen the atmosphere of the tea gathering as called for by the occasion.

== Gallery ==
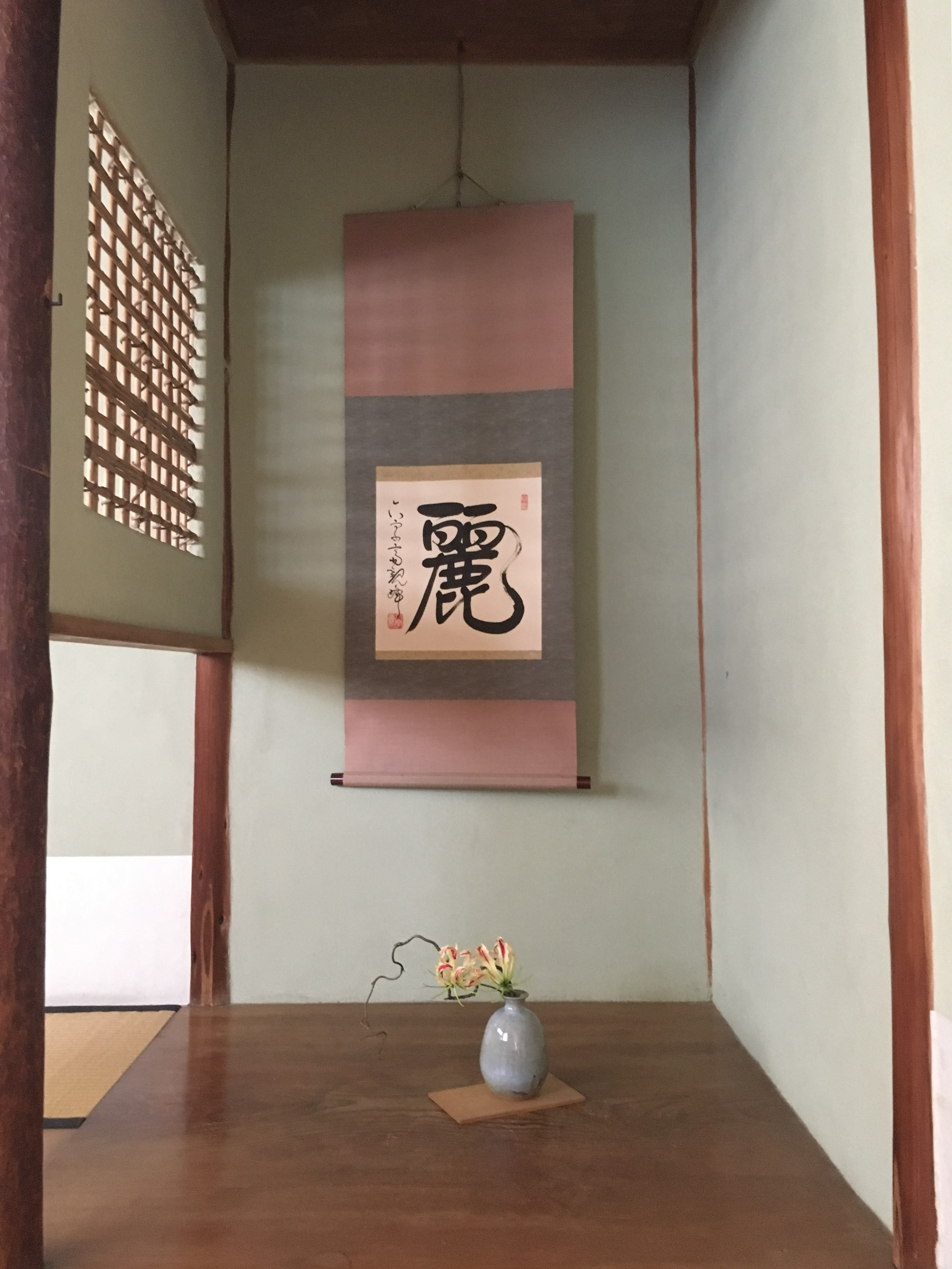
Wider image of the same arrangement within the context of a tokonoma alcove, in front of a kakemono hanging scroll

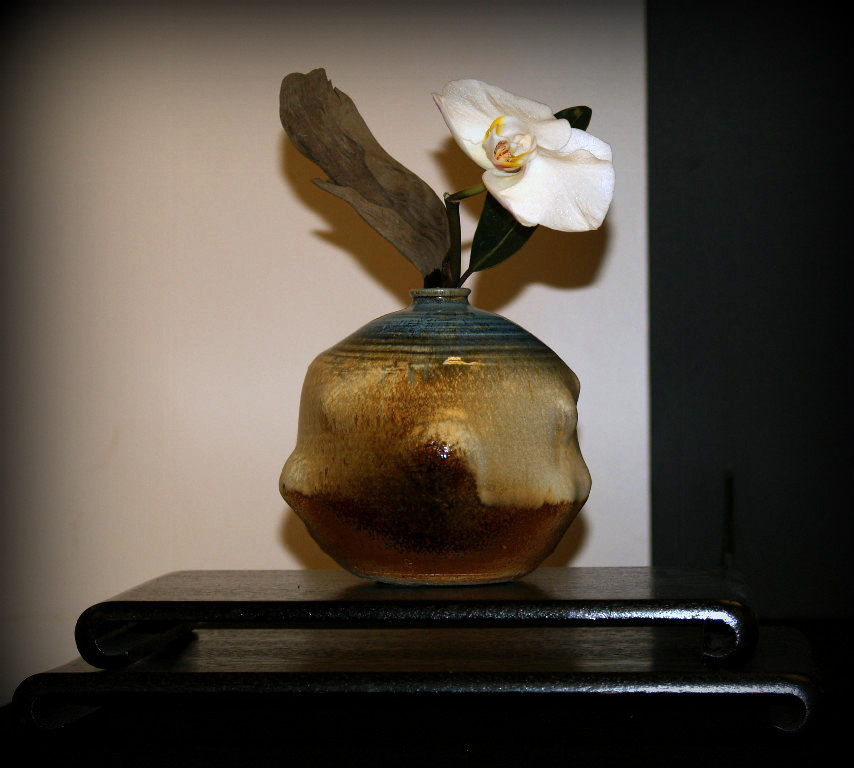
Chabana arrangement of the Banmi Shofu-ryū school

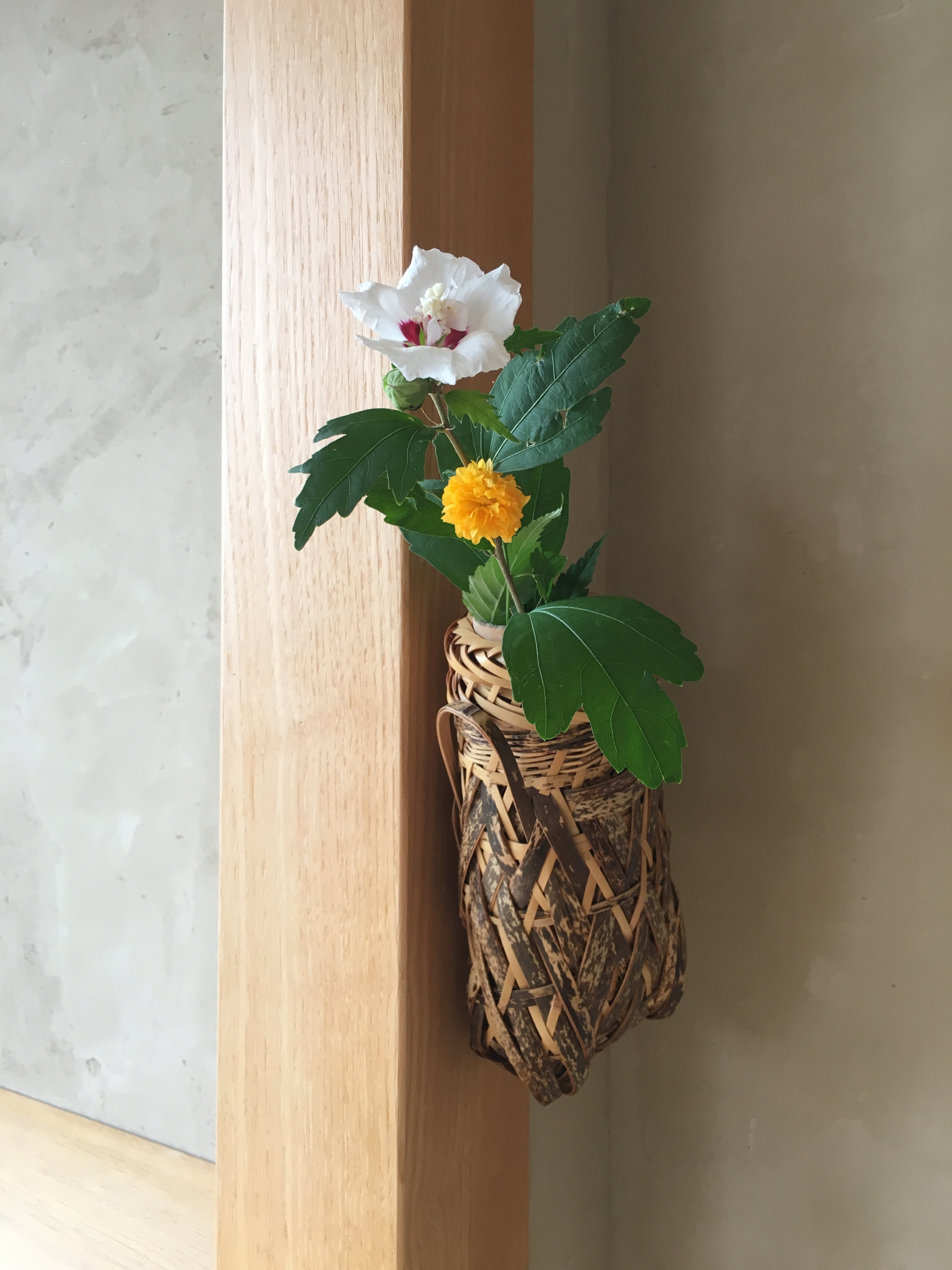
Traditional summer chabana hanging at the tokonoma alcove in a "cicada" bamboo vase, with hibiscus flower.
