= Ohara-ryū =

School of ikebana

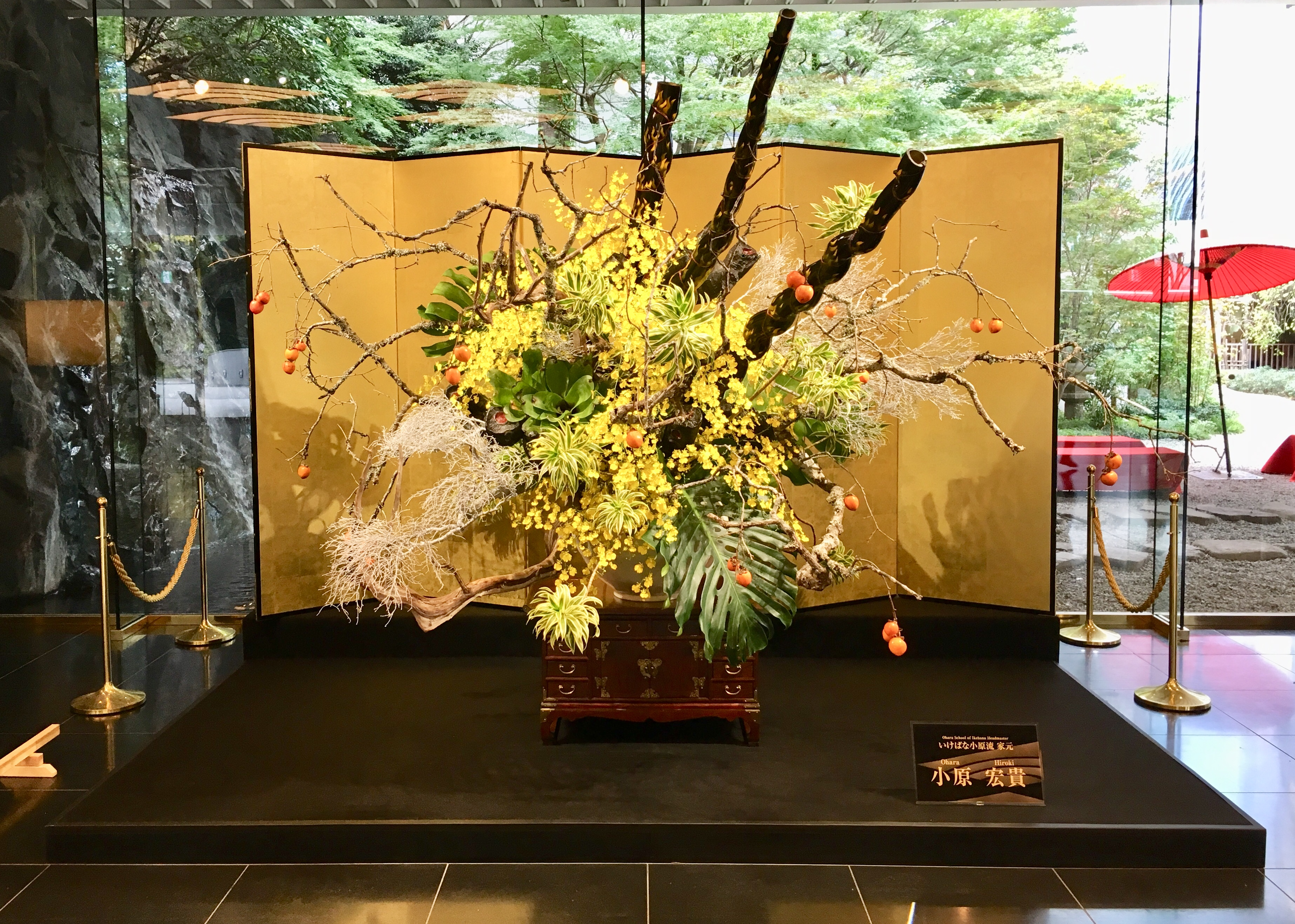
Ohara-ryū floral arrangement by Iemoto Ohara Hiroki (小原宏貴) at the Meguro Gajoen (November 2018)

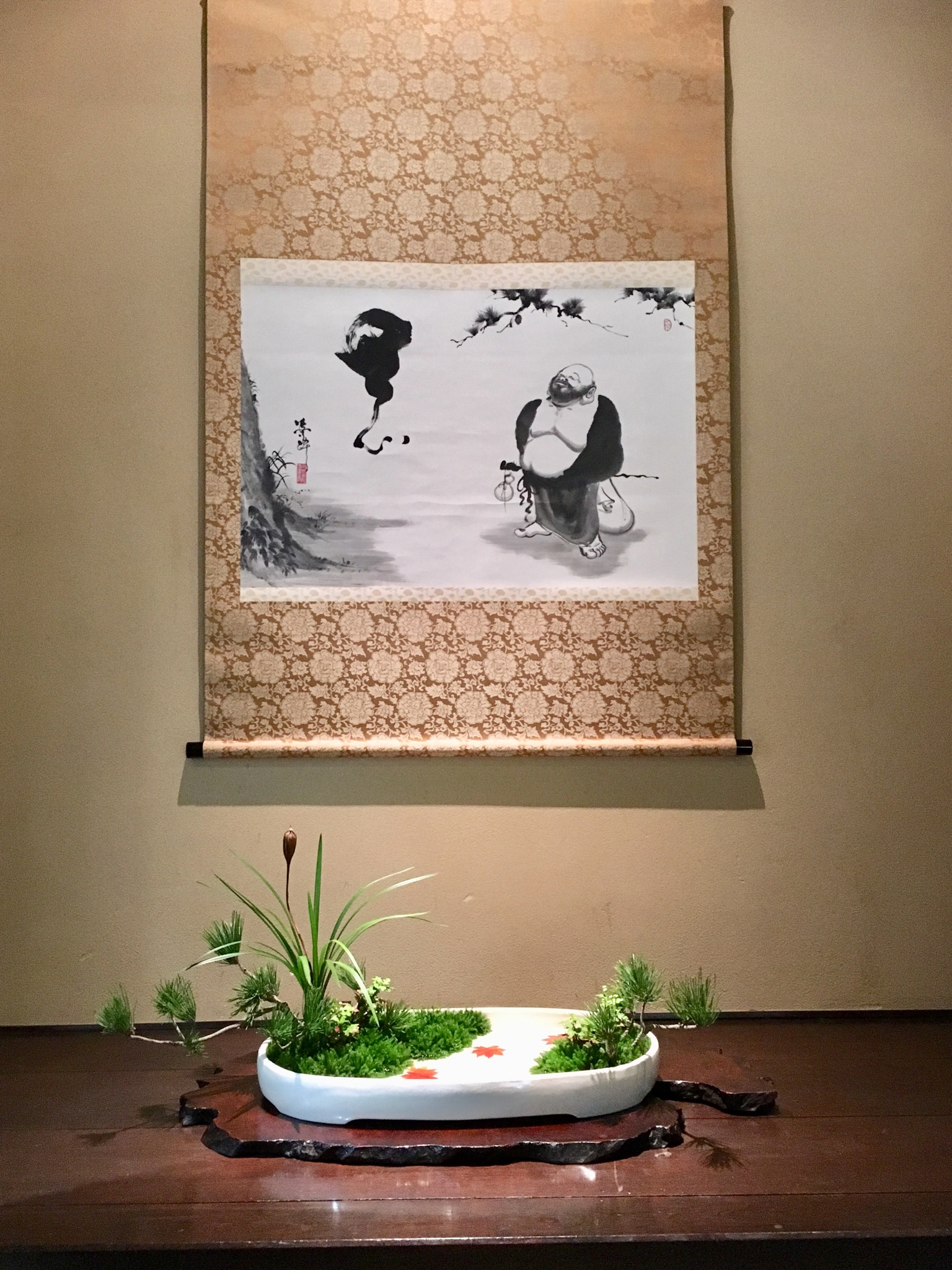
Landscape moribana arrangement in a tokonoma alcove in front of a scroll painting (kakemono)

Ohara-ryū (小原流) is a school of Ikebana, or Japanese floral art.

== History ==
Ohara Unshin (小原雲心) (1861–1916) started his own Ikebana school in 1895 when Japan opened up its economy to the West and began to import European flowers. The official founding date was in 1912. For the purpose of this art form, he developed shallow, circular, ceramic vases, which became known as the moribana style.

Ohara's son Koun (小原光雲) (1880–1938) invented a descriptive teaching method and moved from individual lessons to group classes. For the first time, teaching certificates were awarded to women. Under Houn's guidance, the school grew. Its headquarters were in Tokyo and Kobe, with other centers in New York and São Paulo. He developed the typical landscape style, as well as the rimpa and bunjin floral arrangements. The inspirations for rimpa came to him from rolling picture scrolls, screens (byōbu) and painted subjects of the 17th century. Chinese poetry became the foundation for bunjin arrangements. Houn (小原豊雲) (1908–1995) followed as the third headmaster in 1938.

Houn's son, Ohara Natsuki (小原夏樹) (1949–1992) in turn was appointed as his successor in 1975. In the same year, the small moribana style, using semi circle ceramic vases, was developed. On the occasion of the 90th anniversary of the Ohara school in 1985, Natsuki created a new style called hana-mai (dancing flowers) and later the Hana-isho forms. He died in 1992 at age 42 after an illness and was posthumously named as fourth headmaster. In 1995, his father Houn died at age 86. Houn's daughter Ohara Wakako (born 1940 小原稚子) became interim headmistress until April 2010, when Ohara Hiroki (小原宏貴) became the fifth headmaster.

Presently 125 chapters are in Japan and 57 chapters more across the world.

== Styles ==
The school has various own styles as well as from other schools:

- Hana-ishō (花意匠) is a basic free style.
- Moribana (盛り花) was developed by Ohara Unshin and quickly became popular among other schools.
- Hanakanade (花奏) has two lines crossing each other.
- Hanamai (花舞) is a three-dimensional arrangement.
- Heika (瓶花) is another term for the traditional nageirebana (抛入花).
- Rimpa (琳派) is influenced by the Rinpa school of Japanese art.
- Bunjinbana (文人花) is a Chinese-influenced style.
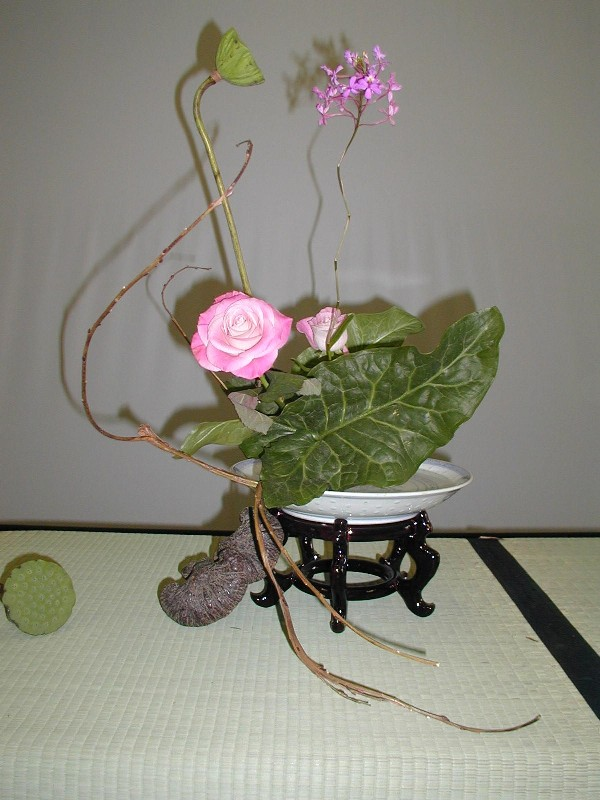
Bunjin with pink rose, evoking lotus scene

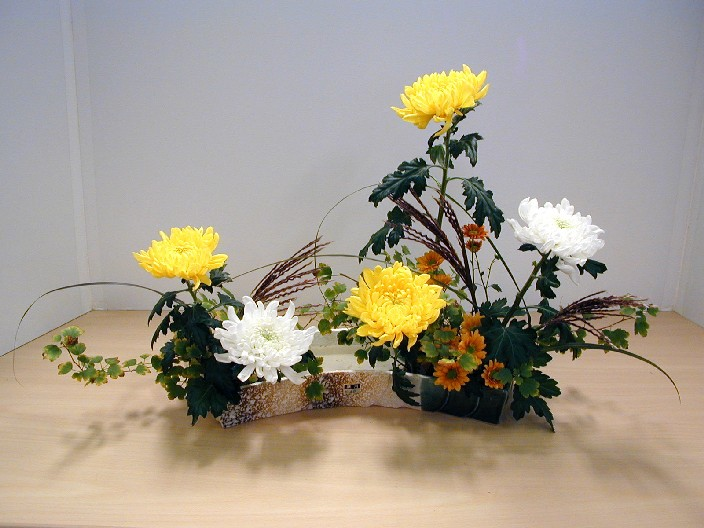
Rinpa using yellow and white chrysanthemums

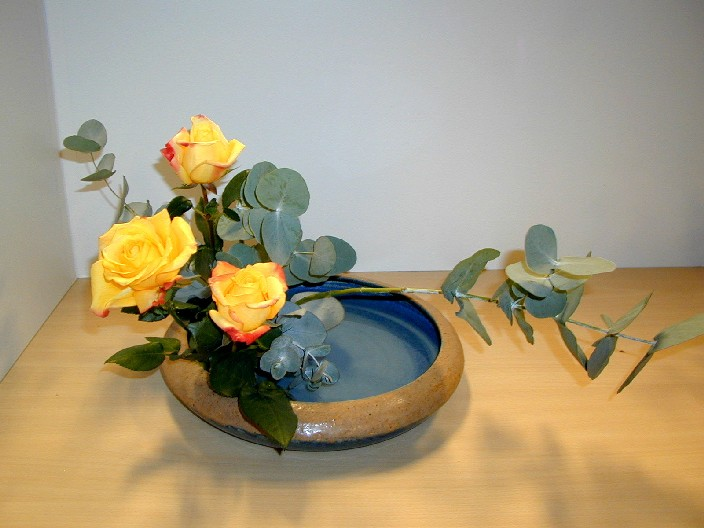
Moribana using yellow roses

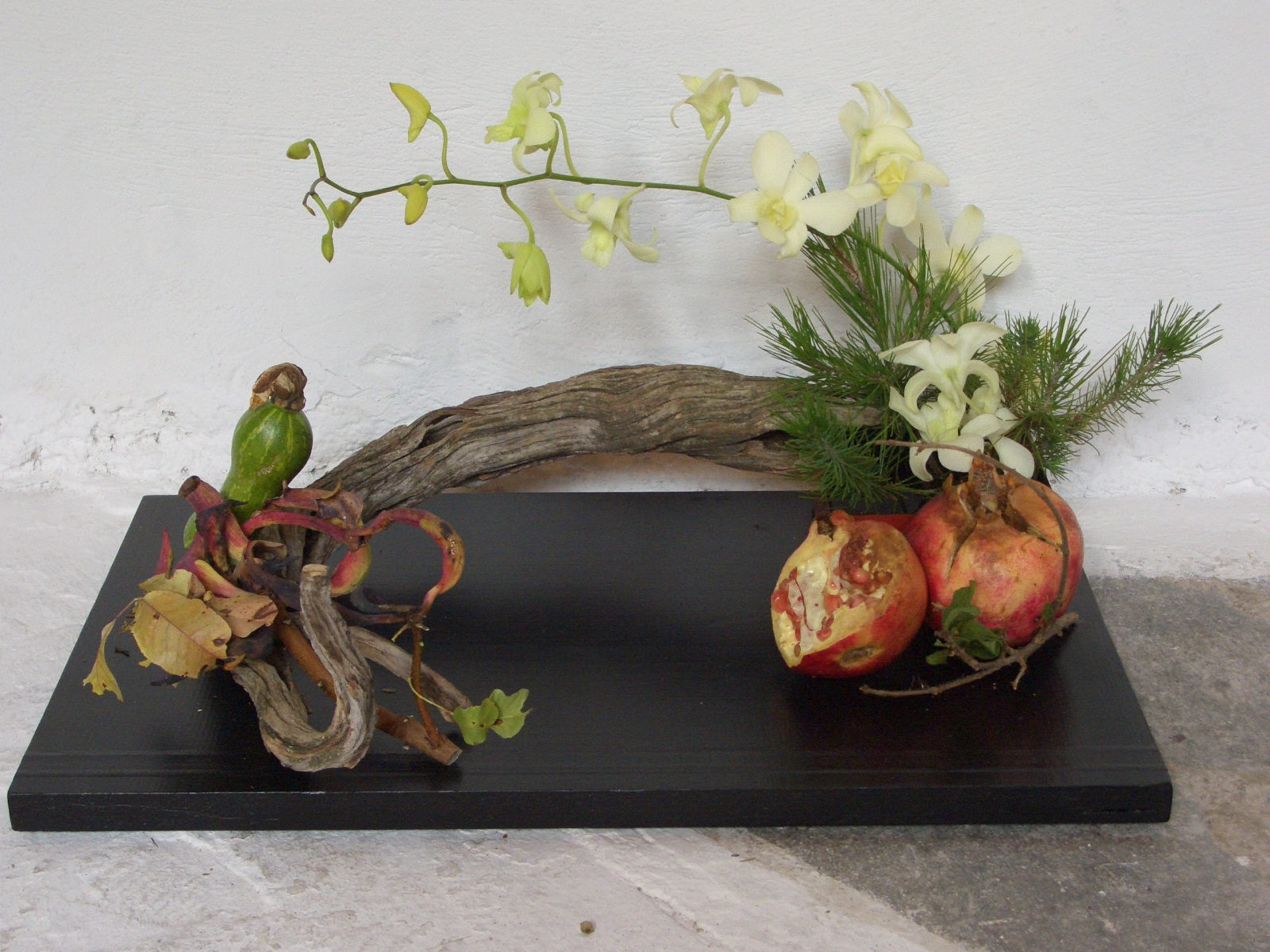
Morimono using wood and fruit

== Headmasters ==
- 1st Ohara Unshin (小原雲心) (1861–1916)
- 2nd Ohara Kōun (小原光雲) (1880–1938)
- 3rd Ohara Hōun (小原豊雲) (1909–1995)
- 4th Ohara Natsuki (小原夏樹) (1949–1992)
- Ohara Wakako (小原稚子) (born 1940), interim
- 5th Ohara Hiroki (小原宏貴), since 2010
