= Hajitomi/Hashimoti =

Hajitomi/Hachitomi (The Lattice Shutter) is a Noh play based on the fourth episode from the Tale of Genji, involving the figure known as Lady Yūgao.

Arthur Waley placed it among the best known of the many Genji-derived Noh plays.

== Plot ==
A monk engaged in devotional flower-arranging is handed a beautiful moonflower by a woman, who then disappears into the flower.

Alerted to the love-story between Prince Genji and the woman named (after the flower) Yūgao or Yugao, the monk goes to the scene of the initial meeting of the pair, which was marked by a Hajitomi, or lattice, upon which the flower was entwined.

A spirit appears, which reminisces about the pair’s meeting over a yūgao bloom, and the poetry the two exchanged. As opposed to the love story’s ultimate tragedy, Hajitomi stresses the nostalgic memory of the flower-woman for her initial meeting with the Prince.

== See also ==
- Lady Moonflower
- Yugao
