= Bunjinbana =

Style of ikebana

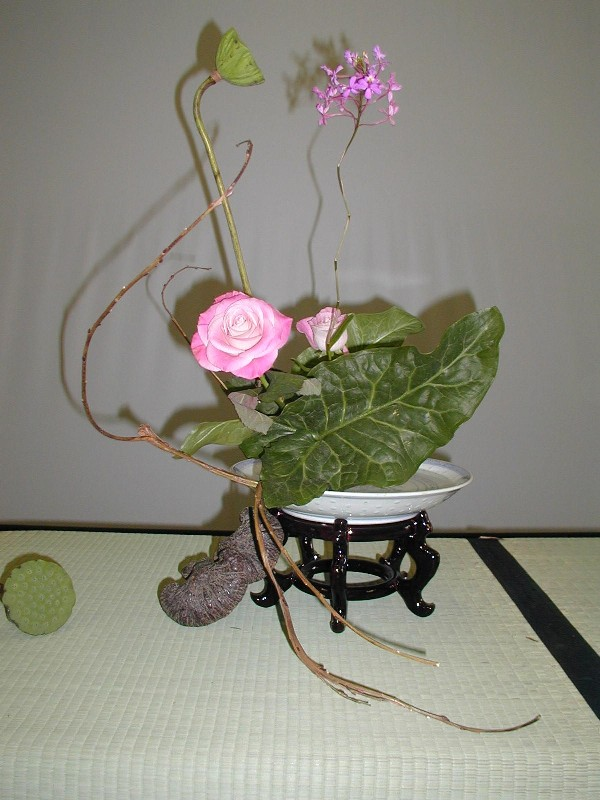
Bunjinbana arrangement

Bunjinbana (文人花, "literati flowers") is a style of ikebana that is inspired by traditional Chinese landscapes. It developed from the Bunjinga (文人画 "literati painting") movement among different Japanese artists of the late Edo period, who however all shared an admiration for traditional Chinese culture and paintings.

The style is also known as bunjinka (文人華).

Morimono (盛り物) is counted as a sub-form of bunjinbana by some schools.

== See also ==
- Moribana
- Senchadō
