= Yugao =

Yugao is a Noh play, sometimes attributed to Zeami, based on the story of Yūgao (Lady Moonflower) from the Tale of Genji.

== Plot ==
A travelling priest is drawn to the decayed villa where Yūgao had died. There he is told by a transient figure of the tragic love of Yūgao and Prince Genji, the poetic imagery stressing both the ephemerality of love, and her humble status compared to the Shining Prince.

In the second part of the play, the figure reappears, identified as the ghost of Yūgao, asking for sympathy, and for prayers of release from her persisting attachment to the love-affair.

== Influence and Performance history ==
- Kenneth Rexroth wrote a monologic poem Yugao, based in part upon the Noh play.
- The play was performed as late as 2022, by the Kito School of Noh.

== See also ==
- Hajitomi/Hashimoti
- Kōguo Tsukuoka
- Renga
