= Moribana =

Expression of ikebana

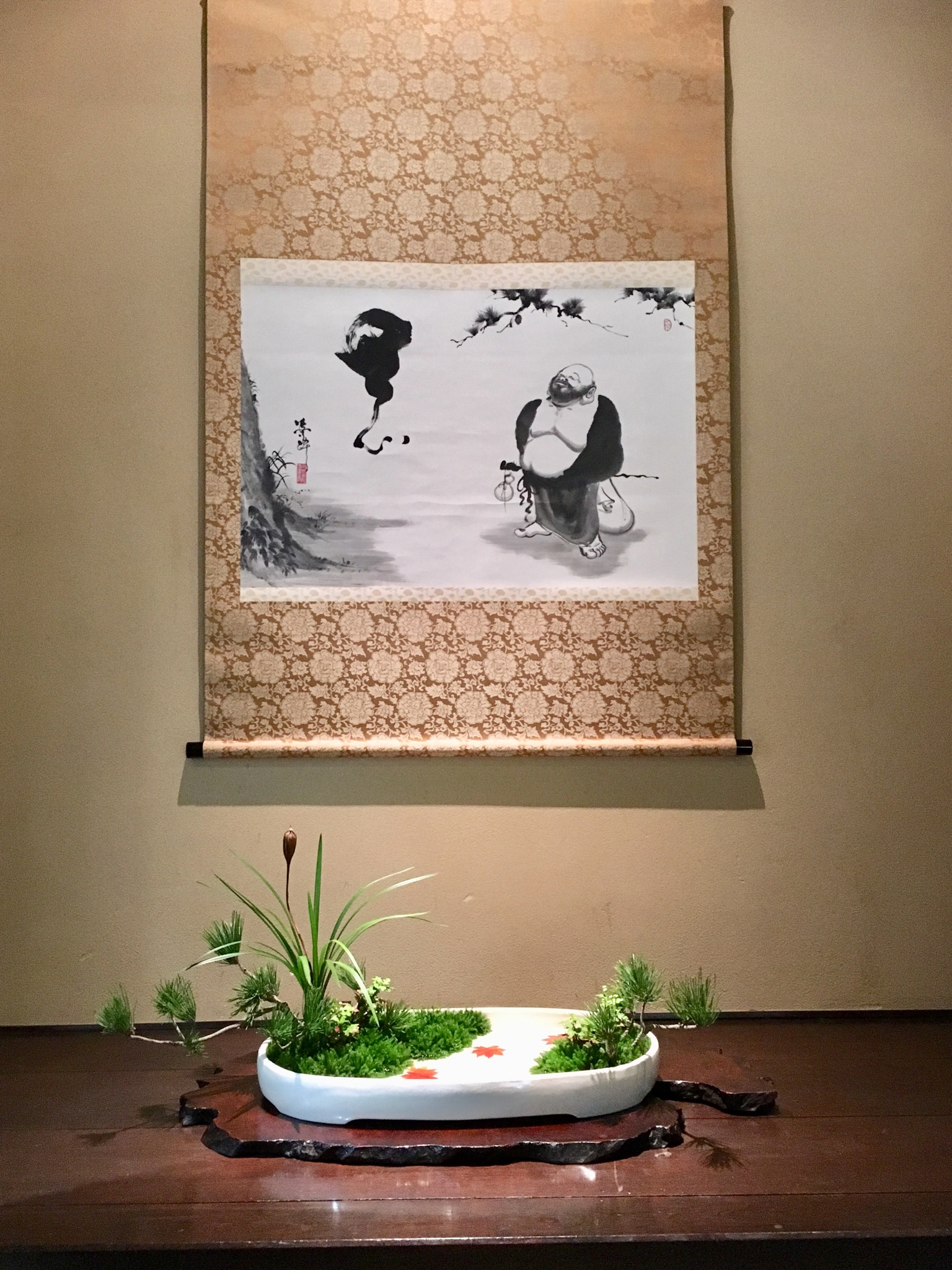
Landscape moribana arrangement by the Ohara-ryū in a tokonoma alcove in front of a scroll painting (kakemono)

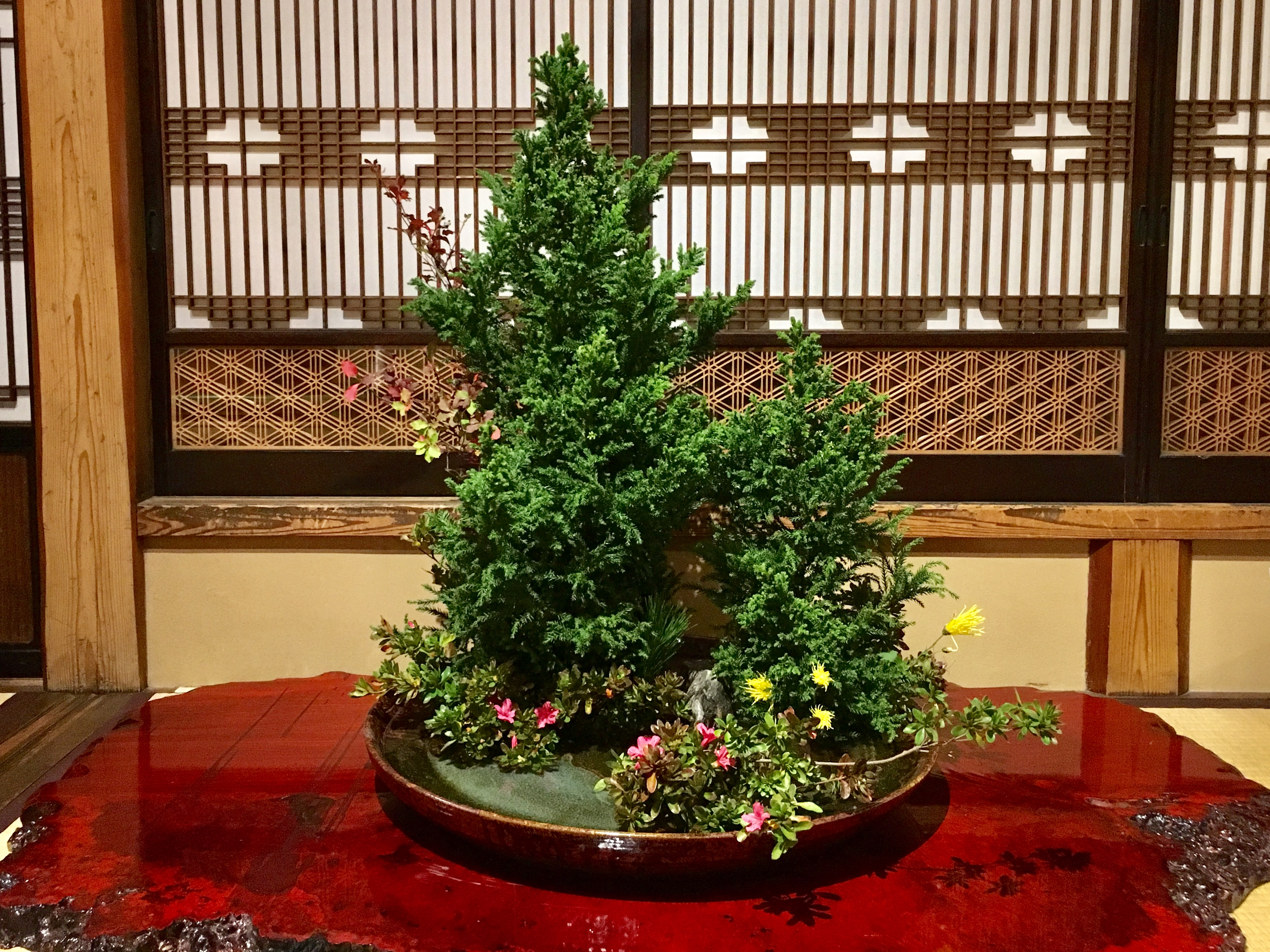
Landscape moribana of the Saga Go-ryū

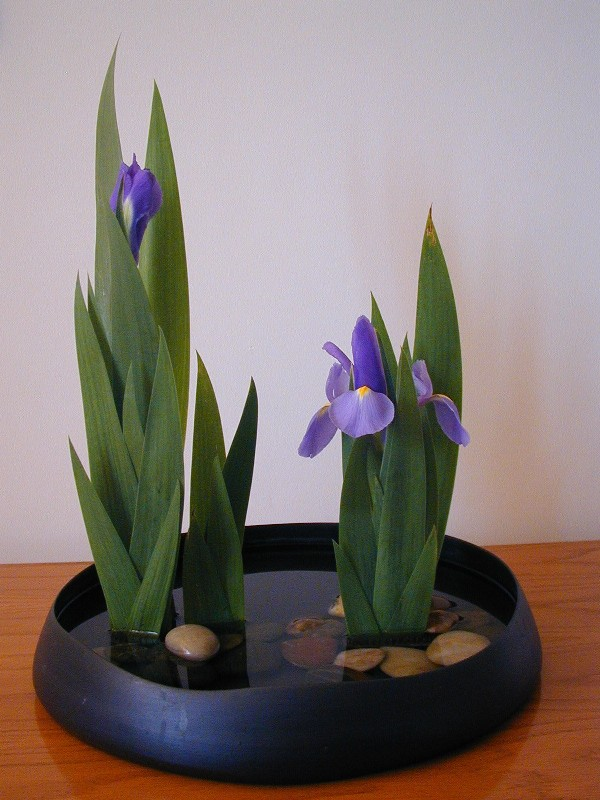
Upright moribana with iris, evoking a water landscape

Moribana (盛り花, 盛花) is one of the expressions of Japanese flower arrangement Ikebana. The word Moribana means "full bloom flowers".

== History ==
This style was introduced by Ohara Unshin around 1890 after the Meiji Restoration of 1868. Moribana is not only an expression of Ohara’s creative departure from Ikenobo, but was also a strong sign of the Western influence in Japan. The arranged flowers may be placed in Western-style rooms and entranceways, not just in the tokonoma alcove found in traditional Japanese-style rooms. While distinctly a hallmark of the Ohara school, moribana has become one of the standard forms learned and created by Ikebana practitioners regardless of school or style affiliation.

Moribana is often associated with nageire, and although the two styles share similarities, their historic development is different, nageire being older.

== Description ==
Moribana uses one or more clusters of arrangements in kenzan, a holder with many sharp points into which flowers are inserted, or shippo that has holes, to replicate how water plants grow and how creatures move around in natural ponds. The main feature of moribana is the broad expanse of natural-looking shapes and a mound of beautiful flowers. Choice of materials and how much water shows in front, side, or back reflects the passing of the season. For example, more water is placed to the front during Spring and Summer.

A proper moribana design uses a flat, shallow container, sometimes referred to as suiban, which allows for the spreading of floral and line materials sideways and away from the earlier classic vertical lines of the rikka, seika and even nageirebana.

== Styles ==
There are different styles of moribana depending on the length and angle of the primary, secondary, and ornamental stems.

- The upright form is the most common; it exudes a feeling of stability and gravity. In this form, the primary stem is about as long as the diameter and depth of the container combined, with the secondary stem being around two-thirds and the ornamental stem about half the length of the primary branch. In the Ikenobō school the upright form is called chokutai (直態).

The primary stem is placed vertically, while the secondary stem is tilted 45 degrees and scattered over a 30-degree area to the front and left. The ornamental stem is tilted 60 degrees and placed across a 45-degree area to the front and right. Seen from above, the three stems form a right triangle. Flowers are placed inside this triangle to fill out the shape.

- Slanting form is a reversed arranging form that can be used depending on the placement of the display or shapes of the branches. Branches that look beautiful when slanted are mostly chosen for this arrangement. This form gives a softer impression than the upright form . In the Ikenobō school the slanting form is called shatai (斜態).
- Cascading or hanging form. In the Ikenobō school the cascading or hanging form is called suitai (墜態). In the Ohara school it is called Water-reflecting style.

Small pebbles may be used to cover the bottom of the container and create a more natural look of the arrangement.

== Images ==
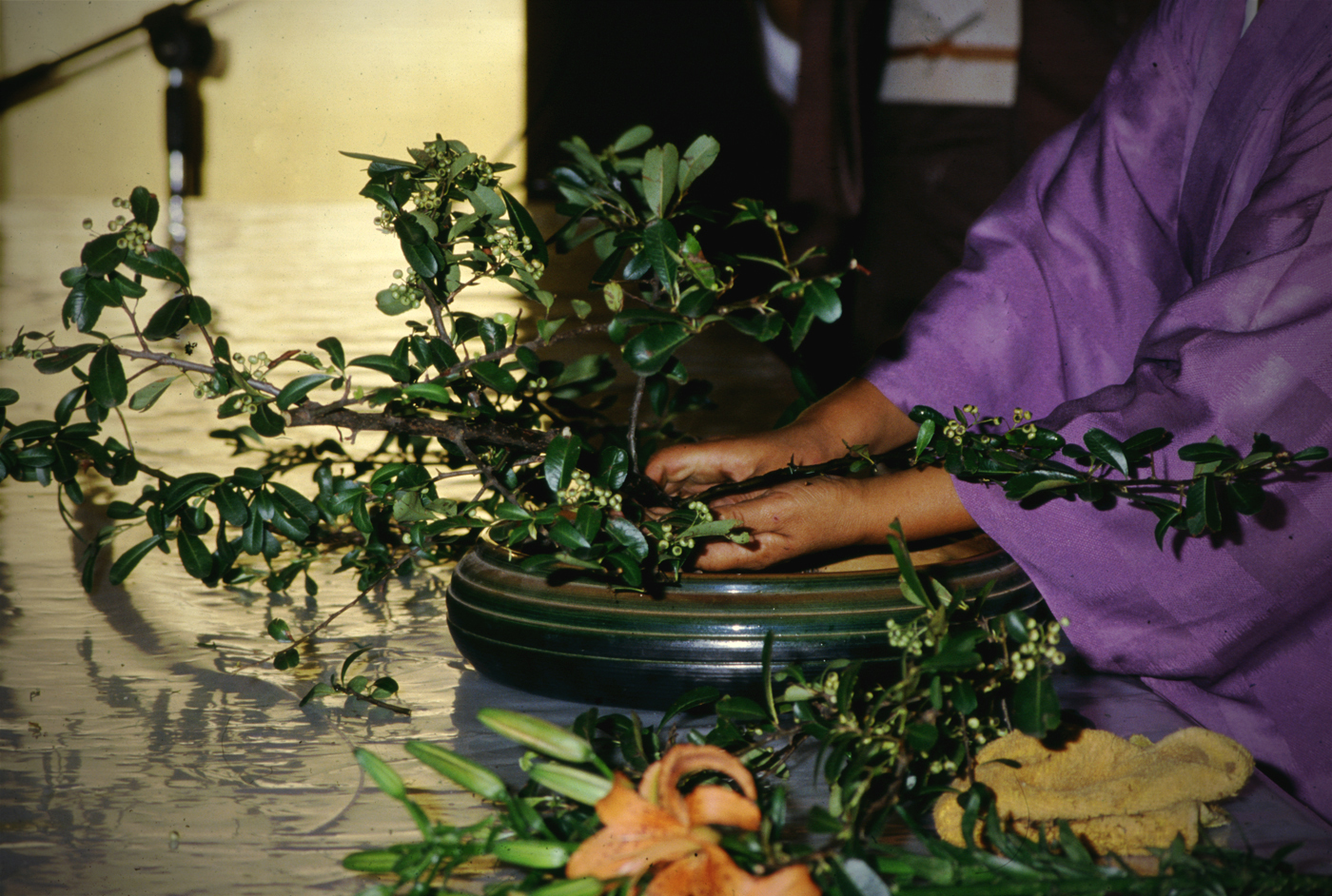
A kadōka creating an arrangement in a flat vessel

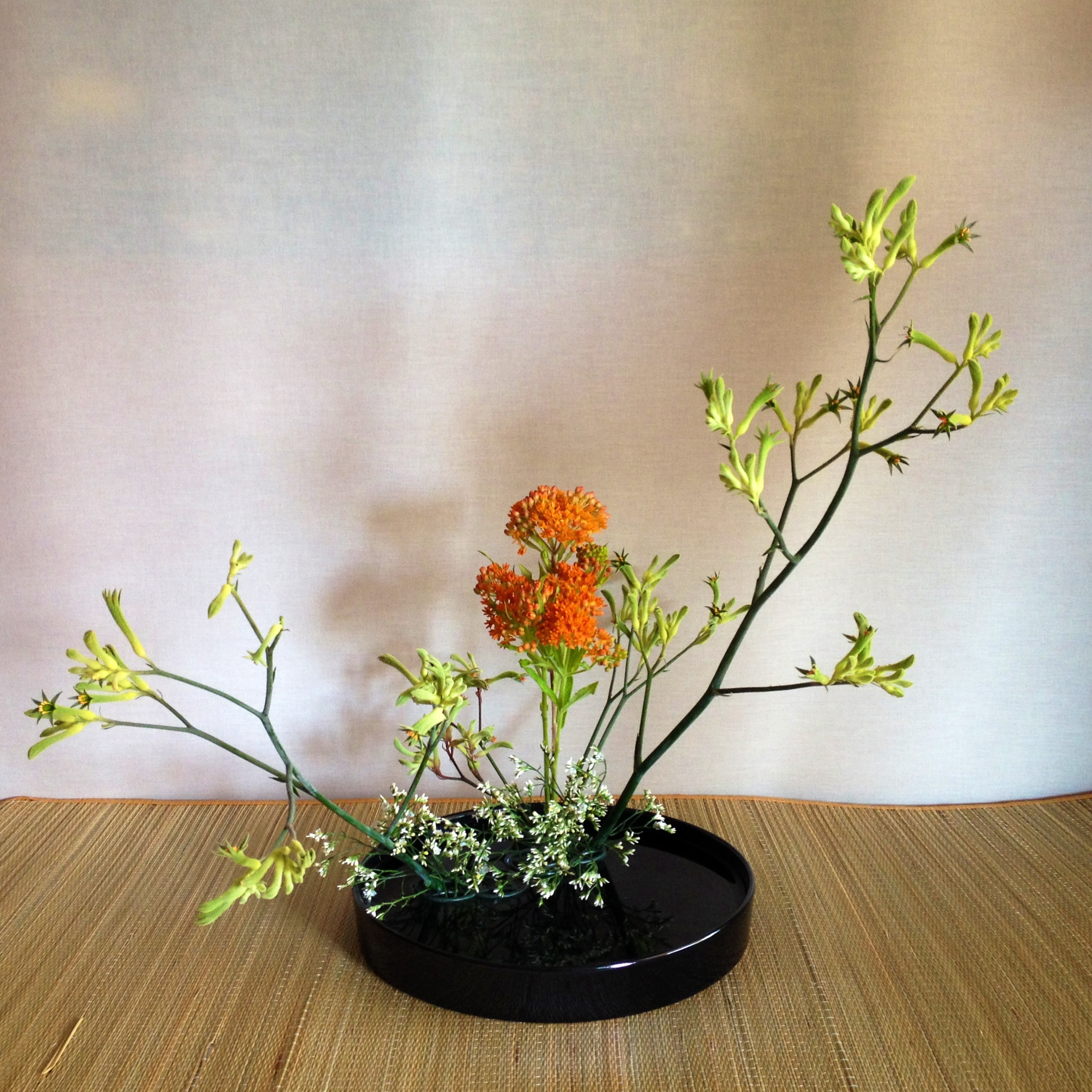
Moribana kōseitai (hidarigatte) of the Saga Goryū

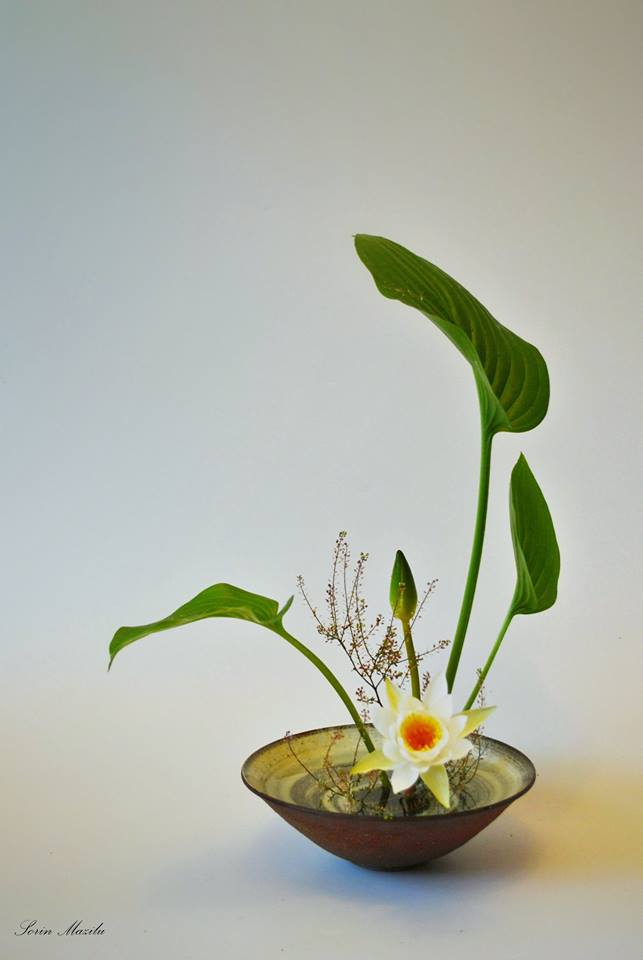
Moribana chokutai (upright style)

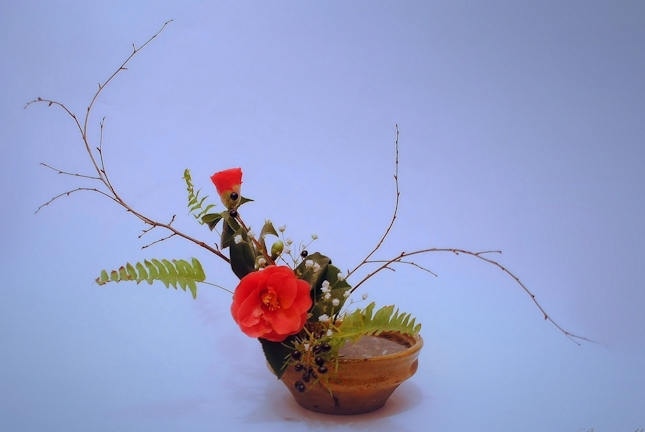
Moribana shatai (slanted style)
