= 1786 in art =

Events from the year 1786 in art.

== Events ==
- November – Boydell Shakespeare Gallery inaugurated in London.
- Francisco Goya is appointed court painter to King Charles III of Spain.

== Works ==
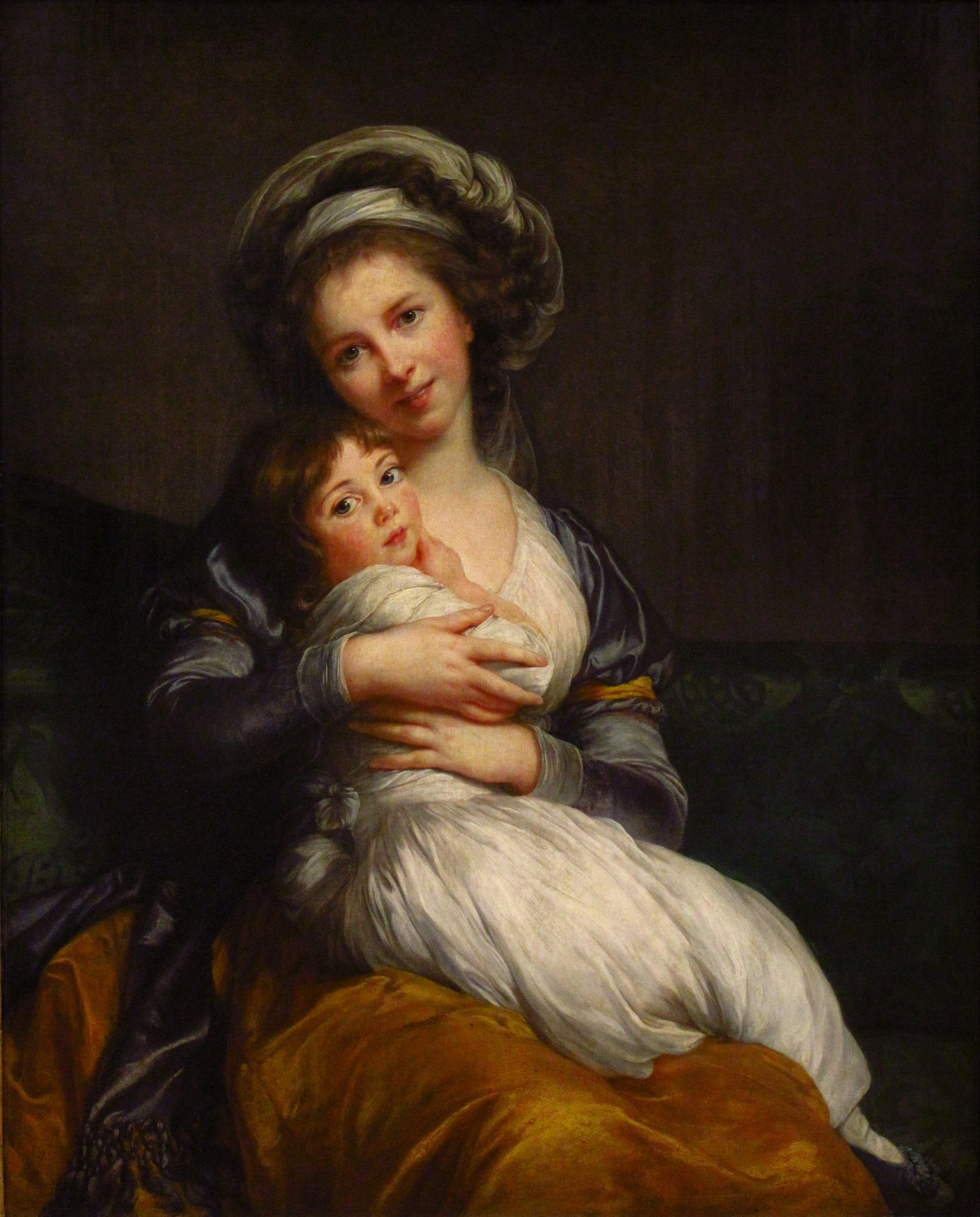
Élisabeth Vigée Le Brun's self-portrait with her daughter

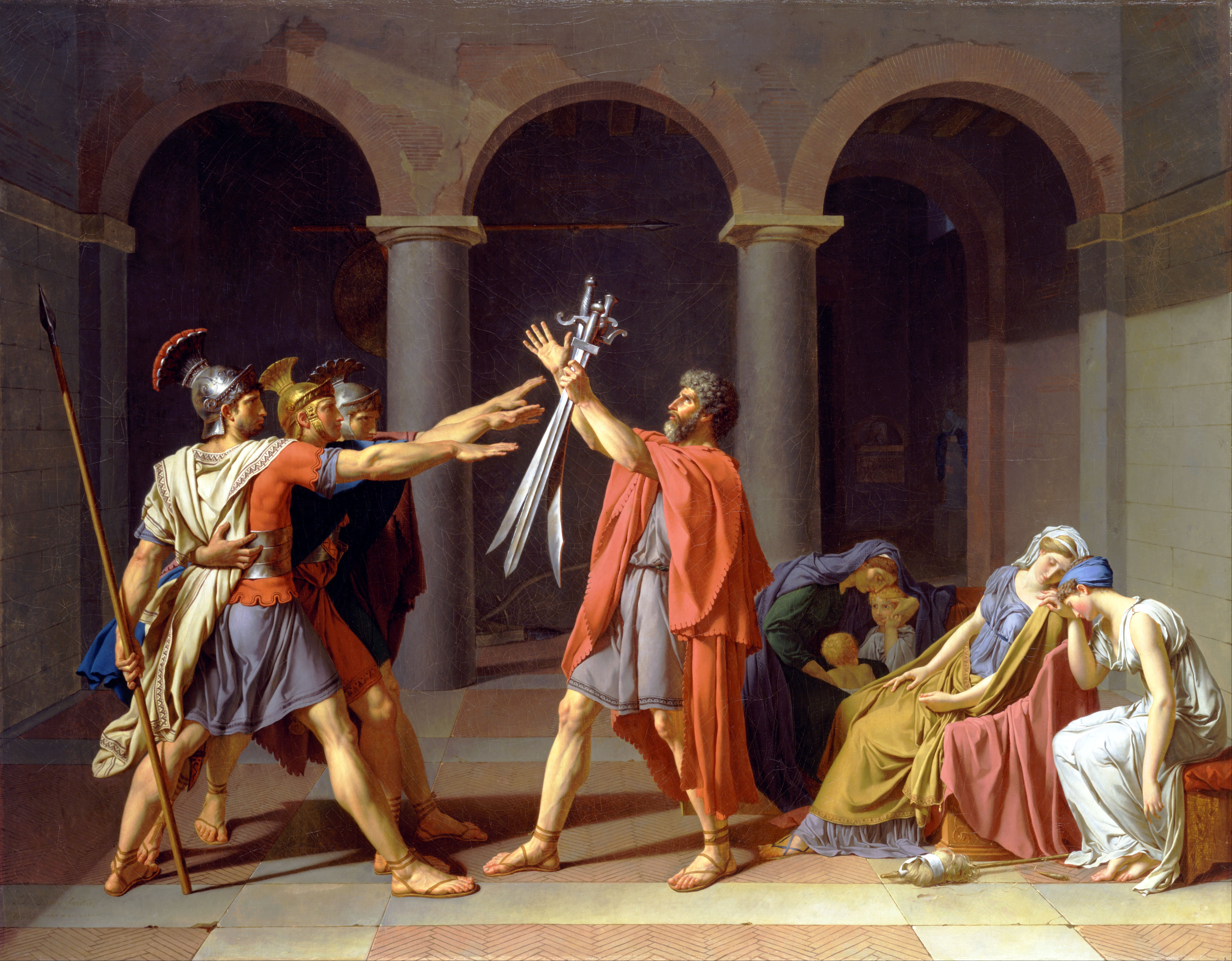
Jacques-Louis David and Anne-Louis Girodet Oath of the Horatii (second version)

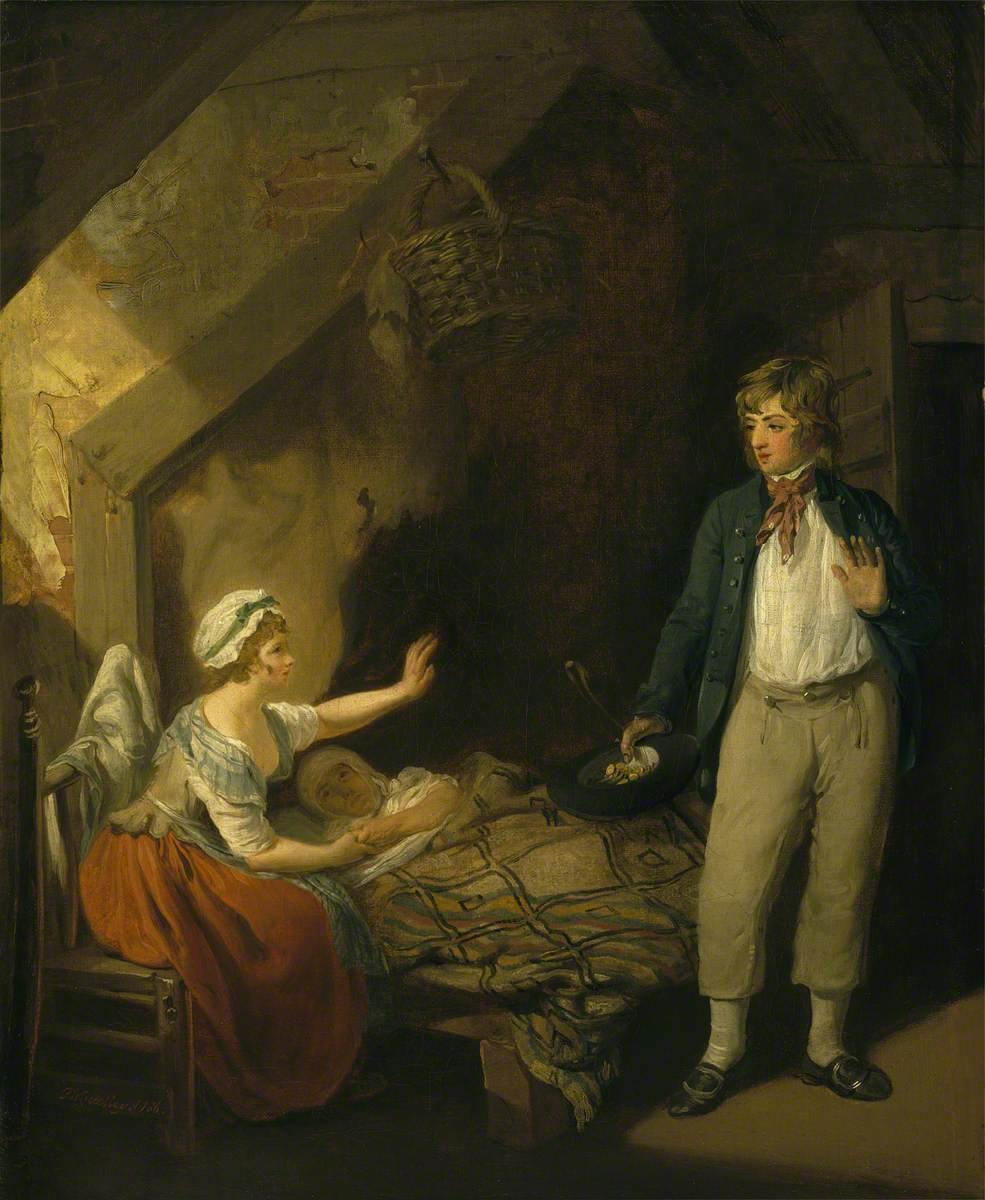
The Sailor's Return by Francis Wheatley

- Mather Brown
  - Portrait of Charles Bulfinch
  - Portrait of Thomas Jefferson
- Jean Germain Drouais – Marius at Minturnae
- Thomas Gainsborough
  - A Country Cart Crossing the Ford
  - Lavinia (The Milk Maid)
- Anne-Louis Girodet – Coriolanus Taking Leave of His Family
- Ozias Humphry – Portrait of Hyder Beg Khan
- James Northcote – The Murder of the Princes in the Tower
- Louise Élisabeth Vigée Le Brun
  - Mademoiselle Sophie
  - Self-portrait in a Turban with Julie
- Jean-Laurent Mosnier – Self-portrait
- Jean-Baptiste Regnault – The Origin of Sculpture
- Joshua Reynolds
  - Admiral Sir Edward Hughes
  - Dr. John Hunter seated in his museum
- Nagasawa Rosetsu
  - Tiger Fusuma
  - Dragon Fusuma
- John Trumbull
  - The Death of General Warren at the Battle of Bunker's Hill, June 17, 1775
  - The Death of General Montgomery in the Attack on Quebec, December 31, 1775
- Benjamin West – Alexander III of Scotland Rescued from the Fury of a Stag
- Francis Wheatley – The Sailor's Return
- Johann Zoffany – Colonel Antoine Polier, Claud Martin and John Wombwell with the Artist

== Births ==
- January 26 – Benjamin Haydon, English historical painter and writer (suicide 1846)
- April 1 – William Mulready, Irish genre painter of rural scenes (died 1863)
- April 16 – Albrecht Adam, painter (died 1862)
- June 3 – Kim Jeong-hui, calligrapher, epigraphist, and scholar of Korea's later Joseon period (died 1856)
- July 5 – Charles Alfred Stothard, historical draughtsman (died 1821)
- July 9 – Rudolph Schadow, German sculptor (died 1822)
- August 8 – Bengt Erland Fogelberg, Swedish sculptor (died 1854)
- August 28 – Ferdinand Piloty, lithographer (died 1844)
- September 28 – Johann Michael Sattler, Austrian portrait and landscape painter (died 1847)
- October 10 – François-Édouard Picot, French historic painter (died 1868)
- November 23 – František Tkadlík, Czech painter (died 1840)
- date unknown
  - Jean Alaux, French history painter and Director of the French Academy in Rome (died 1864)
  - Julien-Honoré-Germain d'Aubuisson, French portrait and miniature painter (died 1860)
  - Georgije Bakalović, Serbian painter (died 1843)
  - Eugénie Honorée Marguerite Charen, French painter (died 1824)
  - Jean Augustin Daiwaille, Dutch portrait painter (died 1850)
  - William Derby, English miniature painter and copyist (died 1847)
  - John Fischer, German portrait, miniature, and landscape painter (died 1875)
  - James Frothingham, American painter (died 1864)
  - Kunisada, Japanese designer of ukiyo-e woodblock prints (died 1865)
  - Abraham Wivell, British portrait painter, writer and pioneer of fire protection (died 1849)
- probable
  - John Hayes, British portrait-painter (died 1866)

== Deaths ==
- January 8 – Johan Edvard Mandelberg, Swedish-born painter (born 1730)
- January 12 – Claude-Henri Watelet, French fermier-général, amateur painter and writer on the arts (born 1718)
- February 6 – Samuel Wale, English historical painter and book illustrator (born unknown)
- February 17 – Thomas Beckwith, English painter, genealogist and antiquary (born 1731)
- March 6 – Charles Germain de Saint Aubin, draftsman and embroidery designer to King Louis XV of France (born 1721)
- March 18 – Jacob Bonneau, Anglo-French painter (date of birth unknown)
- April 12 – Francesco Saverio Mergalo, Italian portrait painter (born 1746)
- April 23 – Alexander Cozens, British landscape-painter in water-colours and teacher of painting (born 1717)
- May 4 – Johann Kaspar Füssli, Swiss painter (born 1743)
- June 21 – George Hepplewhite, English furniture designer (born 1727?)
- July 14 – John Collier, English caricaturist and satirist (born 1708)
- October 17 – Johann Ludwig Aberli, Swiss landscape painter and etcher (born 1723)
- October 30 – William Duesbury, British enameller and entrepreneur (born 1725)
- date unknown
  - Andrea-Salvatore Aglio, Italian sculptor and painter on marble (born 1736)
  - Johann Karl Auerbach, Austrian painter (born 1723)
  - Tilly Kettle, portrait painter (born 1735)
