= John Abbot (entomologist) =

American naturalist and artist

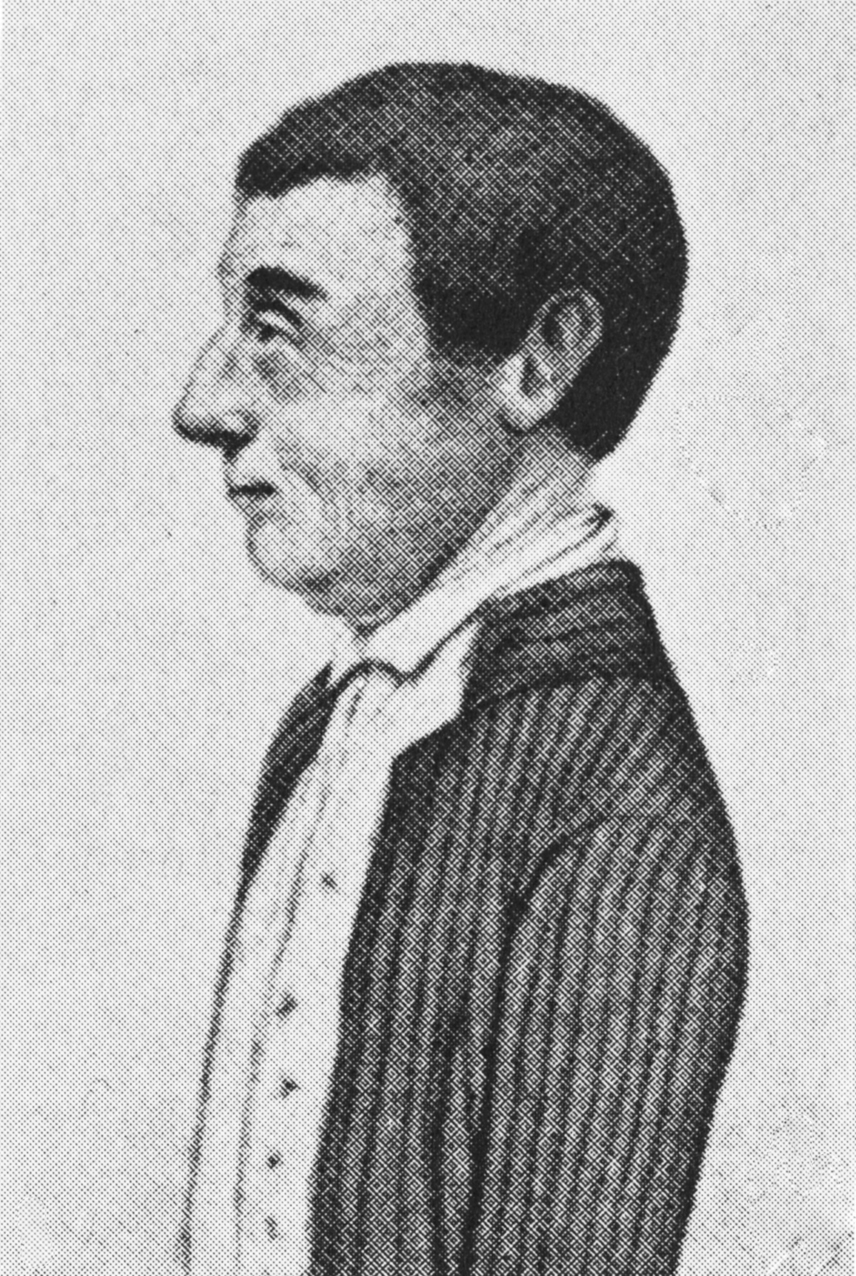
- John Abbot, self-portrait
- Born: 31 May or 1 June 1751; London, England
- Died: December 1840 or January 1841; Bulloch County, Georgia
- Scientific career
- Fields: Entomology; Ornithology

John Abbot (1751—c. 1840) was an American naturalist and artist. He was the first artist in the New World to create an extensive series of insect drawings and to show insects in all stages of development. In addition to more than 3,000 insect illustrations, he also produced drawings of birds and plants. To facilitate his work he collected a great number of insects and reared thousands more. He was considered one of the best insect illustrators of his era and his art and insect collections were sold to an eager market in London.

== Early life ==
By his own recollection, Abbot was born in London on June 1, 1751 but parish records indicate his birthday on May 31. He was the eldest son of James Abbot, a successful attorney, and Ann (Clousinger) Abbot. He grew up in a fashionable London neighborhood of Bennet Street, St. James, and spent part of his time at his family's country house. He was tutored at home and showed an early interest in collecting and drawing. Abbot studied art with Jacob Bonneau and his first known entomological paintings were created in 1766. Abbot's technique improved rapidly and in a few years he was producing some of the best entomological illustrations of the eighteenth-century. The Russian naturalist Andrey Avinoff, an accomplished artist himself, described Abbot's work as "among the masterpieces of entomological portraiture".

Sometime after 1767, Bonneau used his connections to introduce his talented student to Dru Drury, a wealthy naturalist and owner of one of the best insect collections in England. Drury gave Abbot access to his collection and introduced him to other prominent entomologists and naturalists in London. His interest in natural history art was boosted after he received a gift of Catesby's Natural History of Carolina from Lady Sarah Honywood (widow of Sir Philip Honywood). Drury and other members of the Royal Society recognized his talent as an illustrator and encouraged him to go to America to collect insects. Abbot was eager for the adventure and settled on Virginia as his destination. He made arrangements with Thomas Martyn and John Francillon, both naturalists and dealers in natural history collections, to purchase whatever specimens he might ship back to London.

== Virginia ==
Abbot set sail for Jamestown in July 1773. On the voyage he befriended the Goodall family from Virginia and agreed to stay with them at their plantation in Hanover County. He started collecting insects immediately on arrival but his first few years were difficult. The diversity and number of insects in Virginia did not meet his expectations and two of his first three shipments back to London were lost at sea. In addition, politics in Virginia were becoming increasingly divisive as revolution approached. Abbot considered returning to London and Drury encouraged him to travel to Surinam. Instead he decided to join members of the Goodall family and head down to Georgia where he hoped to avoid the upcoming war and find better opportunities for collecting specimens.

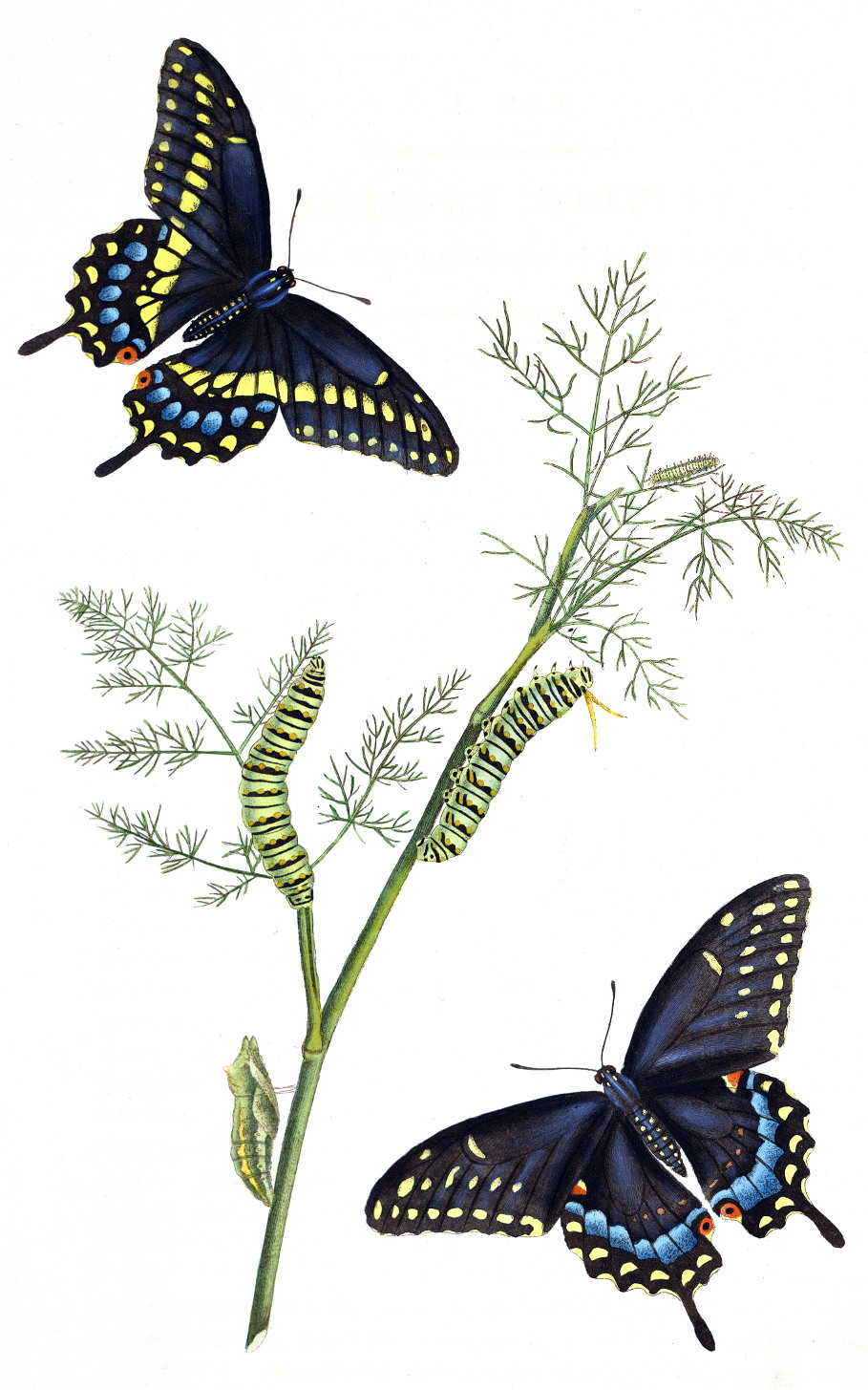

== Georgia ==
Abbot left Virginia in December 1775, travelling overland in harsh winter weather. When he arrived in Georgia, he again stayed with the Goodall family in a log cabin constructed about 100 miles south of Augusta. Although he had hoped to escape the war, hostilities broke out almost as soon as he had settled in Georgia. Abbot served with the Continental Army as a private in the 3rd Georgia Regiment. As a veteran after the war he was granted 575 acres of land where he established a plantation.

At some point, Abbot married Penelope Warren and they had one son, John Abbot Jr., in 1779. Abbot became a successful planter and lived with his family in a large and comfortable house in Burke County. He also continued his work as a naturalist, exploring the Ogeechee and Savannah River basins as well as the coastal area near the port of Savannah. His insect collections and watercolor illustrations were in great demand. In 1797, The Natural History of the Rarer Lepidopterous Insects of Georgia... Collected from the Observations of Mr. John Abbot was edited by James Edward Smith and published in two volumes. It was the first major work on North American insects and contained 104 etchings of watercolors of species that Abbot had collected.

Abbot had a change of fortune around 1795; his wife died and he had some sort of financial difficulties. The details are unknown but by 1806 he was living with his son in Savannah and teaching school to supplement his income. However, he continued his work as a naturalist with a new focus on birds. In the early 1790s he became interested in ornithology and completed more than 1,300 bird illustrations in his lifetime. He collaborated with ornithologist Alexander Wilson and the two of them exchanged a good deal of data on birds.

In 1818 Abbot moved to Bulloch County where he continued to live and work for the rest of his life. as he grew older both his vision and hearing were impaired. His last known shipment of insects occurred in 1836. He died sometime in 1840 or early 1841.

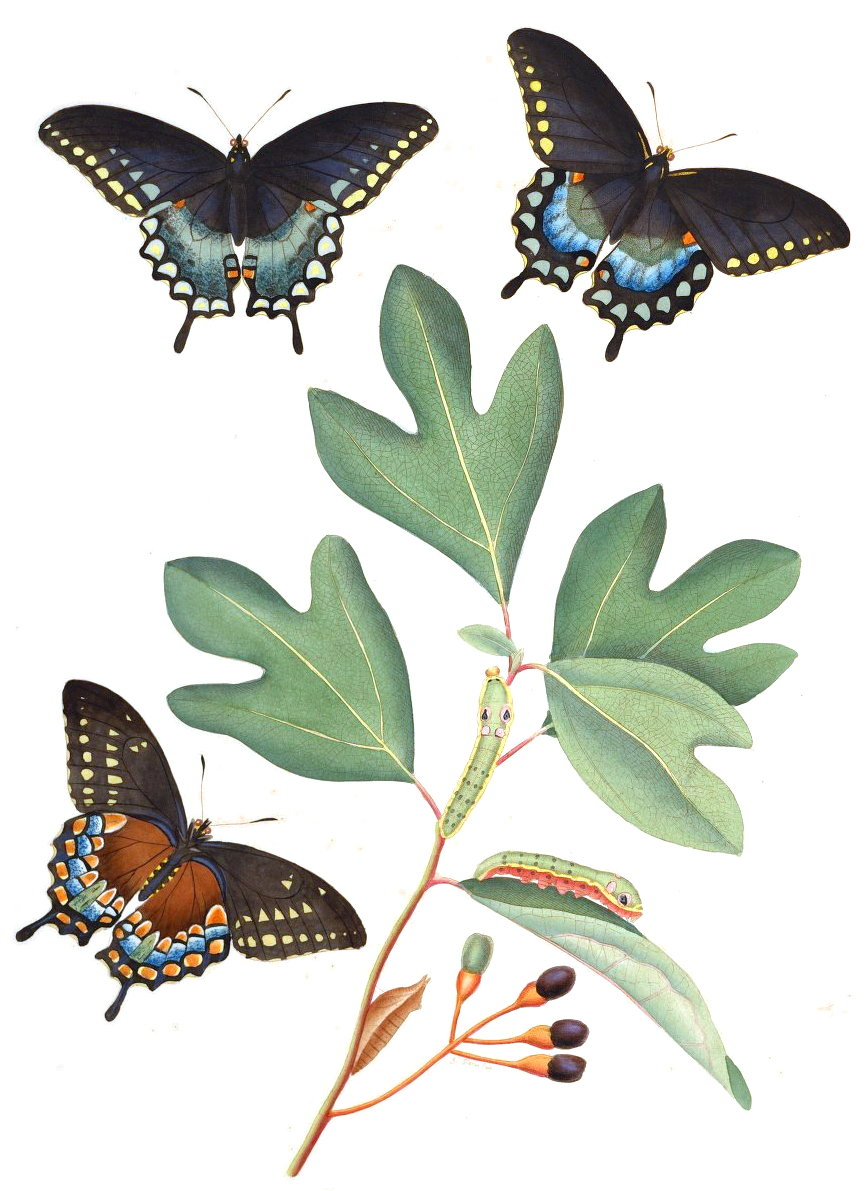

== Legacy ==
He produced thousands of insect illustrations, as well as several sets of bird illustrations. The majority are preserved in the Natural History Museum, London, the British Museum and Houghton Library at Harvard University. Other repositories of his drawings include Johns Hopkins University, University of South Carolina, Emory University, and the Alexander Turnbull Library. Some have been dispersed following various auctions that included his drawings. The bird and insect specimens that he collected were sent to Britain and Europe, but a certain number were lost at sea, which discouraged him. He nonetheless continued to collect and paint specimens until at least 1835.

The only publication to bear his name was The Natural History of the Rarer Lepidopterous Insects of Georgia, whose primary author was James Edward Smith. It included 104 plates that were reproduced from original drawings by John Abbot, which are now preserved at Johns Hopkins University. Abbot also provided most of the observations published in the book. First appearing in 1797, new copies of the book were issued for thirty years.

As a result of this publication including the name of a type of oak inhabited by insects Abbot researched, his legacy includes credit in the International Plant Names Index (IPNI) as a co-publisher (with Smith) of Quercus lobulata, credited as a discovery by Daniel Solander, though later acknowledged as a synonym for the previously discovered Quercus stellata, credited to Friedrich Adam Julius von Wangenheim. For this reason, Abbot has been assigned the taxonomic author abbreviation Abbot for use in botanical nomenclature.

From 1829 to 1837, renowned French entomologist Jean Baptiste Boisduval and wealthy American naturalist John Eatton Le Conte published installments of Histoire Générale et Iconographie des Lépidoptères et des Chenilles de l'Amérique Septentrionale. This publication included 78 hand-colored engraved plates, most created from original drawings by John Abbot. The majority of these original drawings are now deposited at the University of South Carolina. A collection of 130 watercolors of birds, are held by the Smithsonian Institution.

Ornithologist Elsa G. Allen promoted Abbot's ornithological work in articles published in The Auk, and in her 1951 book The History of American Ornithology Before Audubon. In 1957, a ceremony in Savannah, Georgia was held in Abbott's honor, and involved Allen unveiling a memorial dedicated to him. At the time of her death, Allen was working on a biography of Abbott, for which she received a grant from the National Academy of Sciences. One critic said that Abbot was Allen's "peculiar province".

== Works ==
- with James Edward Smith, The Natural History of the Rarer Lepidopterous Insects of Georgia Collected from Observations by John Abbot (1797) (2 volumes, 104 plates).
- Drawings of the Insects of Georgia, in America (1792–1804) (17 volumes, unpublished).
- Original drawings for Jean Baptiste Alphonse Dechauffour de Boisduval's and John Eatton Le Conte's Histoire Générale et Iconographie des Lépidoptères et des Chenilles de l'Amérique septentrionale (1833).

== Sources ==
- Calhoun, J. (2004). Histoire Générale et Iconographie des Lépidoptères et des Chenilles de l'Amérique septentrionale by Boisduval and Le Conte (1829-[1837]): original drawings used for the engraved plates and the true identities of four figured taxa. Journal of the Lepidopterists' Society 58:143-168.
- Calhoun, J. (2006). A glimpse into a 'flora et entomologia': The Natural History of the Rarer Lepidopterous Insects of Georgia by J. E. Smith & J. Abbot (1797). Journal of the Lepidopterists' Society 60:1-37.
- Calhoun, J. (2006). John Abbot's "lost" drawings for John E. Le Conte in the American Philosophical Society Library, Philadelphia. Journal of the Lepidopterists' Society. 60:211-217.
- Calhoun, J. (2007). John Abbot's butterfly drawings for William Swainson, including general comments about Abbot's artistic methods and written observations. Journal of the Lepidopterists' Society. 61:1-20.
- Calhoun, J. (2007). The butterfly drawings by John Abbot in the Hargrett Rare Book and Manuscript Library, University of Georgia. Journal of the Lepidopterists' Society. 61:125-137.
- Calhoun, J. (2007). Butterfly drawings by John Abbot in the Houghton Library, Harvard University, that are wrongly attributed to an inferior copyist. Journal of the Lepidopterists' Society. 61:228-232.
- Calhoun, J. (2013). Remarks about the life and death of John Abbot (1751-c.1840). Southern Lepidopterists' News. 35:44-52.
- Calhoun, J. V. (2018). John Abbot, Jacob Hübner, and Oreas helicta (Nymphalidae: Satyrinae). News of the Lepidopterists' Society. 60:159-163.
- Calhoun, J. V. (2019). A strange Colias (Pieridae) among John Abbot's illustrations of Georgia Lepidoptera. News of the Lepidopterists' Society. 61:8-11, 37.
- Calhoun, J. V. (2019). A persistent case of mistaken identity: Charles A. Walckenaer's collection of spider drawings by John Abbot is in Paris, not London. Journal of Arachnology. 47:377-380.
- Calhoun, J. V. (2019). In the footsteps of John Abbot: the first modern record of Chlosyne gorgone (Nymphalidae) and other gems from coastal Georgia. News of the Lepidopterists' Society. 61:72-73.
- Calhoun, J. V. (2019). From oak woods and swamps: the butterflies recorded in Georgia by John Abbot (1751-c.1840) based on his drawings and specimens. Journal of the Lepidopterists' Society. 73:211-256.
- Calhoun, J. & D. Johnston (2010). John Abbot, the English naturalist-artist in Virginia. Banisteria. 35:3-10.
- Gilbert, P. (1998). John Abbot: birds, butterflies and other wonders. Merell Holberton (London): 128 p.
- Hollingsworth, D. (1989) (ed.), The History of Screven County, Georgia (Dallas, Tex.: Curtis Media Corporation).
- Mallis, Arnold (1971). American Entomologists. Rutgers University Press. pp. 3–9. ISBN 9780813506869.
- Neri, J., T. Nummedal & J. V. Calhoun (2019). John Abbot and William Swainson: art, science, and commerce in nineteenth-century natural history illustration. University of Alabama Press (Tuscaloosa, Alabama): 239 p.
- Rogers-Price, V. (1983). John Abbot in Georgia: the vision of a naturalist artist (1751-ca.1840). Madison-Morgan Cultural Center (Madison, Georgia): 149 p.
- Rogers-Price, V. (1997). John Abbot's birds of Georgia: selected drawings from the Houghton Library Harvard University. Beehive Press (Savannah): xlii + 26 pl.
- Sorensen, W. Conner (1995). Brethren of the Net, American Entomology, 1840-1880. University of Alabama Press.
- Sterling, Keir B., ed. (1997). "Abbot, John". Biographical Dictionary of American and Canadian Naturalists and Environmentalists. Greenwood Press.
- Wilkinson, Ronald S. (1984). "John Abbot's London Years". The Entomologist's Record and Journal of Variation. 96: 110–123.
