= Kushimoto Ōkyo Rosetsu Art Museum =

- 串本応挙芦雪館
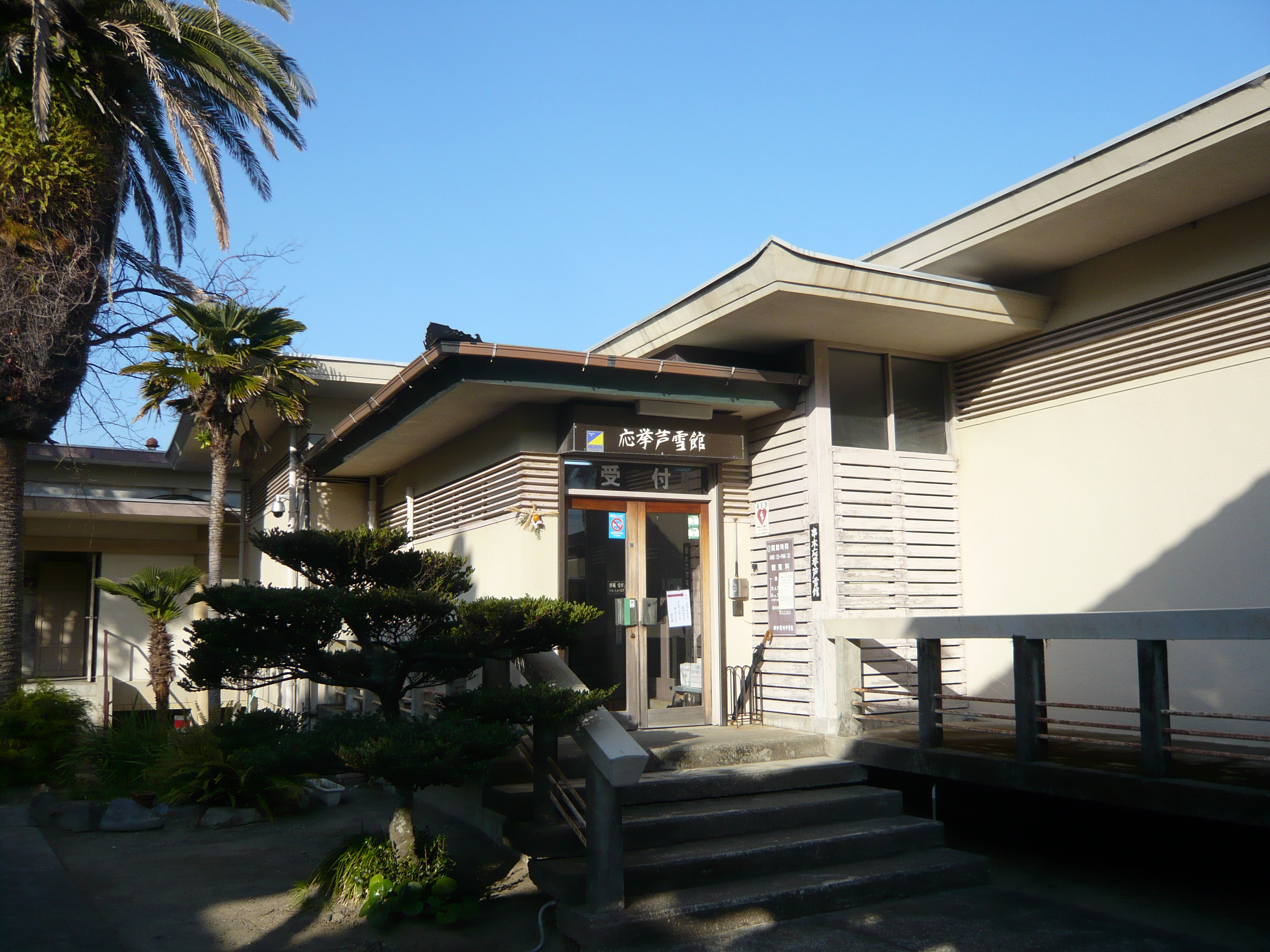

General information
- Location: Kushimoto, Wakayama Prefecture, Japan
- Coordinates: 33°28′13″N 135°46′42″E
- Opened: November 1961

Website
- Official website (ja)

The Kushimoto Ōkyo Rosetsu Art Museum (串本応挙芦雪館, Kushimoto Ōkyo Rosetsu Kan) is an art museum in Kushimoto, Wakayama Prefecture, Japan. The museum opened on the grounds of Muryō-ji in 1961 and comprises five exhibition rooms in two single-story reinforced concrete buildings. The collection includes a series of fifty-five painted panels by Maruyama Ōkyo and Nagasawa Rosetsu (among them, the Dragon and Tiger Fusuma) that have been designated an Important Cultural Property; ninety-six paintings and calligraphic works by artists including Kanō Sansetsu, Kanō Tan'yū, Hakuin Ekaku, Itō Jakuchū, and Mu'an, passed down as temple treasures of Muryō-ji; more recent paintings and sculptures, including works by Kumagai Morikazu and Matsumura Sotojirō; and 1,584 archaeological artefacts from the Kasashima Site (笠嶋遺跡) that include Jōmon and Yayoi ceramics.

== See also ==
- Kushimoto Turkish Memorial and Museum
- Cape Shionomisaki
