= Leroy Wilcox =

American ornithologist and prolific bird bander (1899–1978)

LeRoy Wilcox
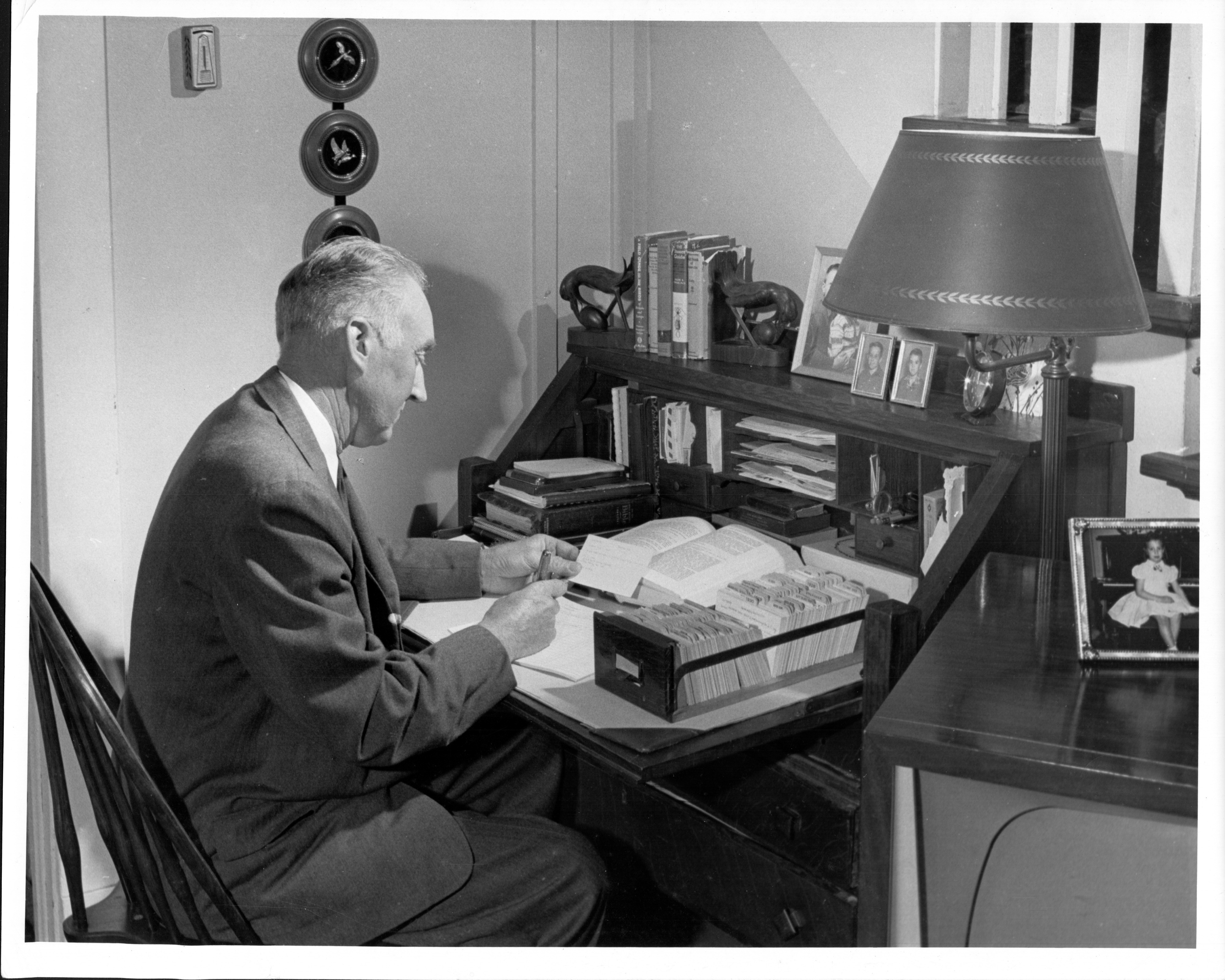
- Born: Stephen LeRoy Wilcox; October 9, 1899; Speonk, New York
- Died: August 13, 1978 (aged 78)
- Occupations: Duck farmer and ornithologist

Stephen LeRoy Wilcox (October 9, 1899 – August 13, 1978) was an American ornithologist and prolific bird bander.

== Early life and education ==
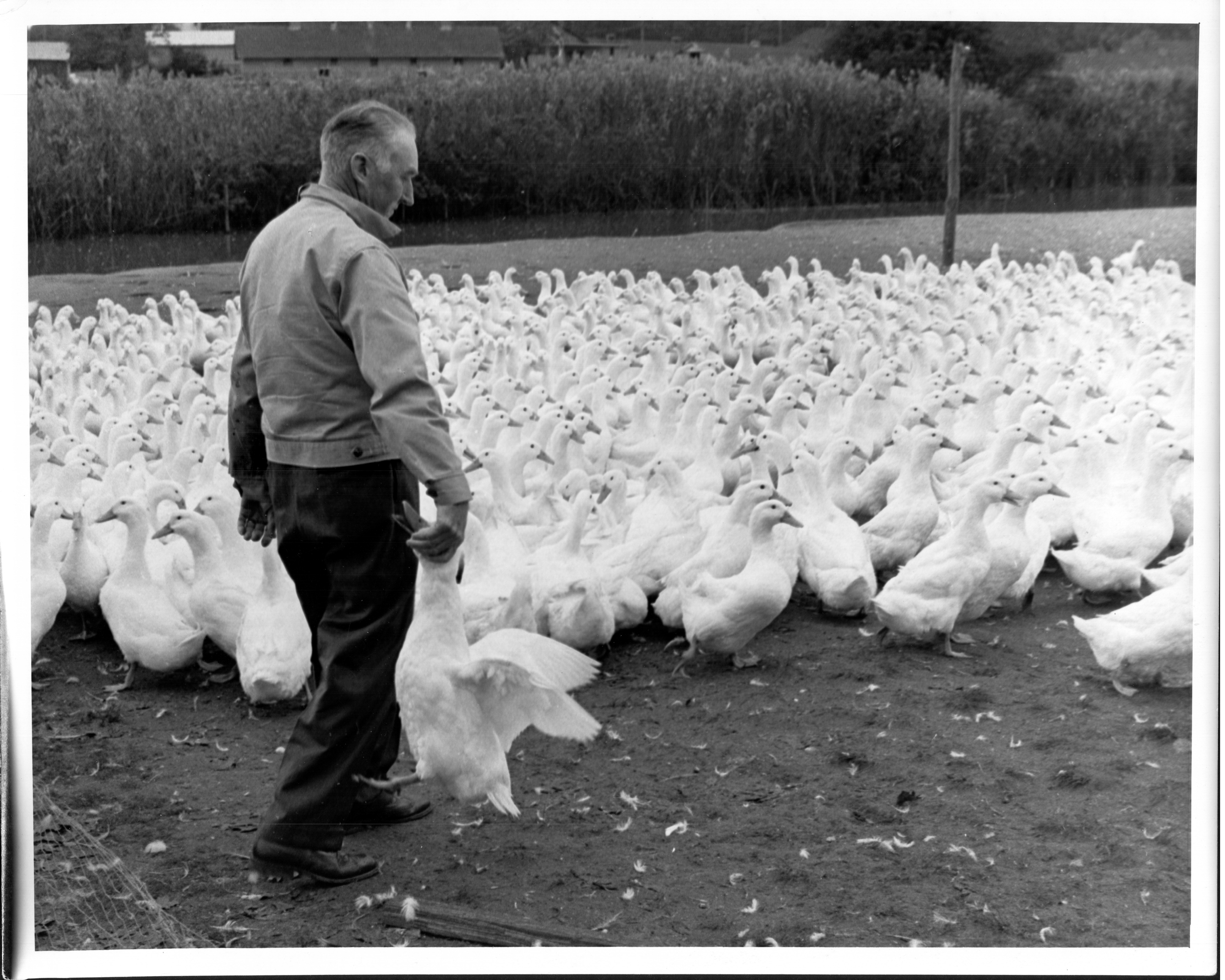
LeRoy Wilcox with ducks on his duck farm

LeRoy Wilcox was born in Speonk, a village in Southampton township, Suffolk County, New York. He attended Tanners Neck School, Westhampton, Westhampton Beach High School, and Cornell University, where, during the winter of 1919, he took a one-term poultry and game breeding course, studying under Arthur A. Allen, who had in 1916 established the first courses in ornithology and wildlife conservation in the United States.

== Career ==
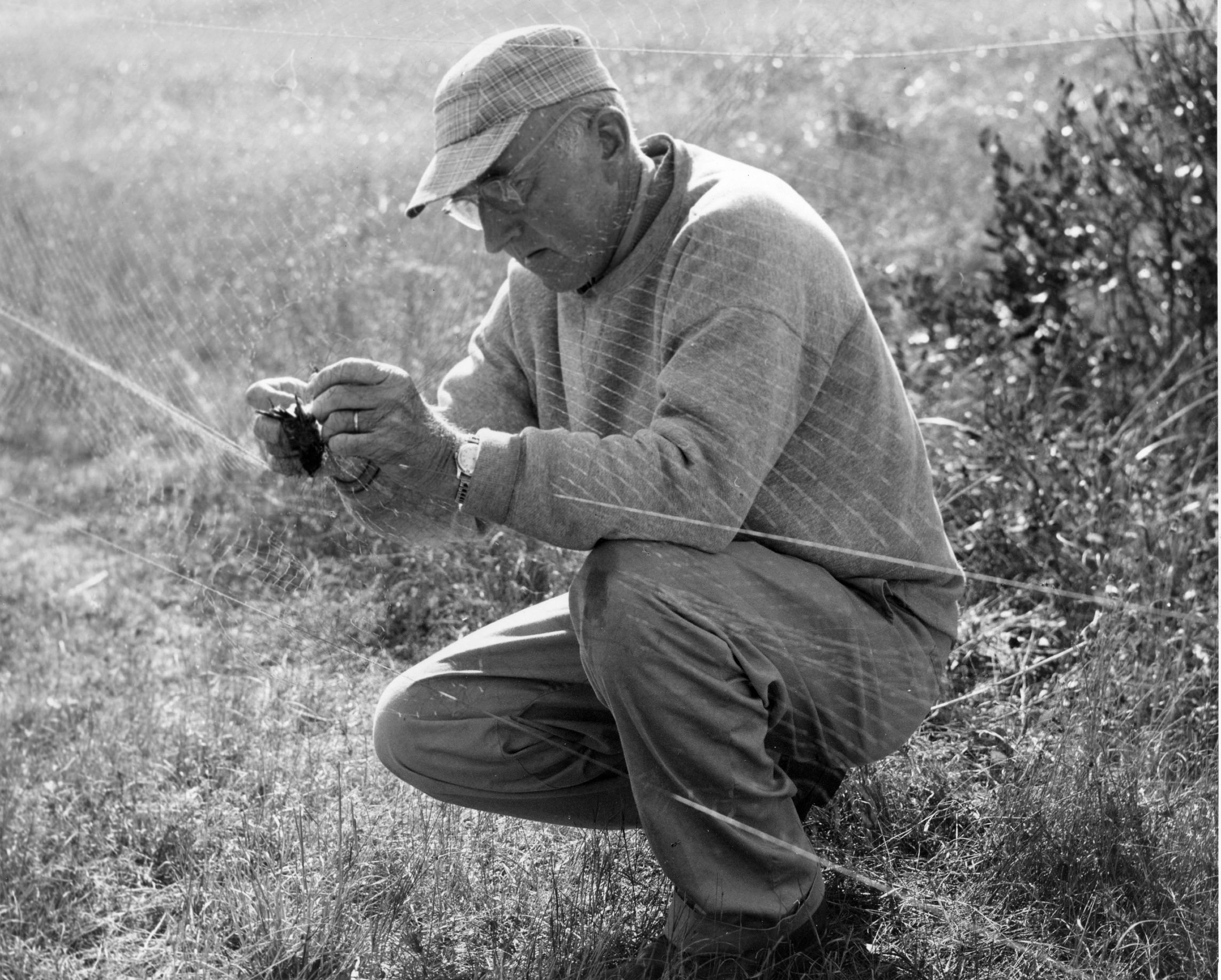
LeRoy Wilcox with a small bird caught in a mist net

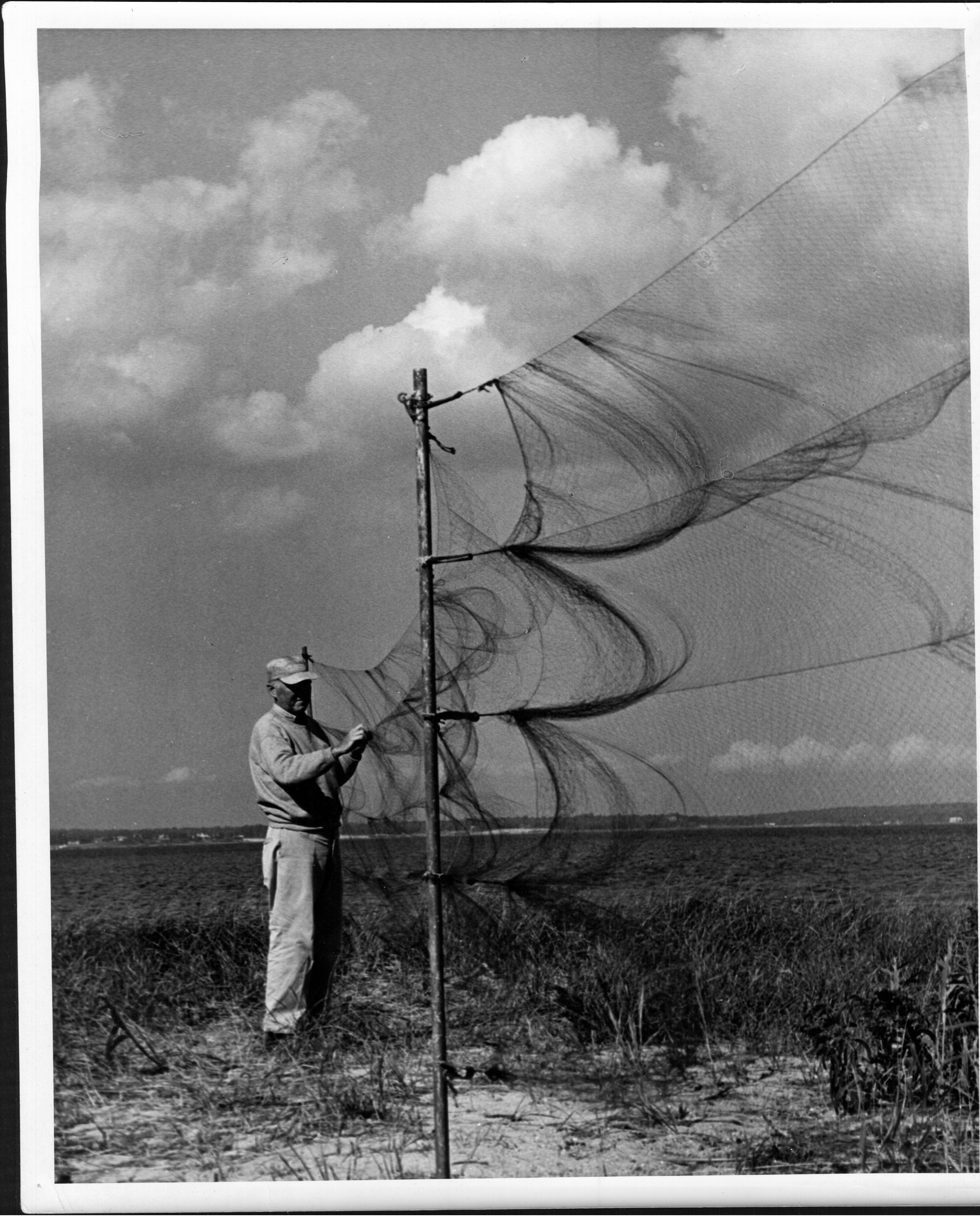
LeRoy Wilcox tending to a mist net

After an interval as proprietor of The Brushy Neck Pheasantry, where he bred ring neck pheasants and trap-nested single comb white leghorns, LeRoy Wilcox took over operations of the oldest commercial duck farm in the United States, the Oceanic Duck Farm, which had been founded in 1883 by his father Eugene O. Wilcox.

Wilcox became a bird bander in 1927 and spent more than 25 years studying piping plover (Charadrius melodus), producing the first detailed study of the bird and having more returns "than the combined total of all other banders." (Note: A "return" is a bird which, having been banded, is recaptured at the same location after having returned from an annual migration (or migrations) for the first time.) He was also specially interested in Osprey, Common Tern, Oystercatcher, and Willet, banding thousands of birds each year (with more than 132,000 in his lifetime), carrying out bird censuses, and regularly publishing observations in The Auk, the Kingbird, The Wilson Bulletin, and other bird club and ornithological publications. He was responsible for a number of "firsts," sightings of rare birds in New York and the United States, and at least one "oldest." LeRoy Wilcox gave illustrated lectures on bird banding at the American Museum of Natural History, in New York City, at the Academy of Sciences, in Philadelphia, and at the United States National Museum, in Washington, D.C., and elsewhere and led the Moriches Bay Audubon Society's monthly birding trips. His work with birds led to his being frequently profiled in New York newspapers.

Wilcox was a member of several scientific societies (the American Ornithological Union, the National Audubon Society, the Linnaean Society, the Eastern Bird Banding Association, the Wilson Ornithological Club, Yale's Lepidopterists’ Society, and the American Malacological Union, whose members appreciate mollusks) and collaborated widely with researchers attached to the Cornell Duck Research Laboratory in Eastport, Long Island, and with other ornithologists and members of the Linnaean Society. He banded nestlings on Gardiners Island, New York, for more than 20 years, and worked with other ornithologists to help to understand how DDT contributed to the decline of Ospreys in southern New England and on Long Island.

Wilcox's interests were not confined to birds; he studied botany, insects, fish, reptiles, and mammals. He was also a keen local historian and genealogist.

== Personal life ==
LeRoy Wilcox married Georgianna Robinson in 1922. They had two daughters, Janice and Jean, and a son, David. Stony Brook University holds the papers of LeRoy's daughter, Jean, in The Emory Payson and Jean Wilcox Tuttle Estate Collection, which includes many of his papers.
