= Elsa Guerdrum Allen =

American ornithologist

- Born: 19 May 1888; Washington, D.C.
- Died: 29 January 1969 (aged 80); Utica, New York
- Education: Cornell University (BS, PhD)
- Known for: Ornithology and ornithological history
- Notable work: The History of American Ornithology Before Audubon (1951)
- Spouse: Arthur A. Allen (1913-1964)
- Children: 5

Elsa Guerdrum Allen (19 May 1888, Washington, D.C. – 29 January 1969, Utica, New York) was an American ornithologist, lecturer, author and historian of ornithology, known for her 1951 book The History of American Ornithology Before Audubon. Most of her scholarly work dealt with the history of ornithology in North America before 1830.

== Education and personal life ==
Elsa Guerdrum was born on 19 May 1888. She was of Scandinavian descent, with her surname an Anglicized version of the Swedish name Gjerdrum.

She received her B.S. from Cornell University in 1912. In August 1913, she married the ornithologist Arthur A. Allen, whom she usually accompanied on his expeditions. The couple had five children between 1918 and 1927, one of whom proceeded Elsa in death. She earned a Ph.D. in zoology from Cornell in 1929, writing her thesis on chipmunks. She died on January 29, 1969.

== Career ==
Allen worked at Cornell University's Fuertes Library for several years, and was a research collaborator at the Cornell Laboratory of Ornithology.

Allen is credited with rediscovering and popularizing the work of early naturalist John Abbot, to the point that one critic referred to Abbot as Allen's "peculiar province". In 1957, a ceremony in Savannah, Georgia was held in his honor, with Allen present, that concluded in her dedicating a monument in his memory. She also promoted the works of Alexander Wilson and Mark Catesby; according to Alan Feduccia, the first major archival study of Mark Catesby's life was Elsa Allen's 1937 article in The Auk. Allen also made several recordings of bird calls.

She received a grant from the National Academy of Sciences to write a biographical study of John Abbott, but died before it could be completed. Other unpublished works include The Story of Lalla, a novel inspired by her Scandinavian roots, and "Minerva's Daughter", a story she had wanted to publish in the Women's Press. These works, as well as Allen's diaries, photographs, and other papers, are held in the Cornell University Library's Division of Rare and Manuscript Collections.

== Works ==
=== Articles ===
- "Some sixteenth century paintings of American birds". The Auk. 53 (1): 17–21. 1936. doi:10.2307/4077351. JSTOR 4077351.
- "New light on Mark Catesby". The Auk. 54 (3): 349–363. 1937. doi:10.2307/4078089. JSTOR 4078089.
- "Jaques Le Moyne, First Zoological Artist in America". The Auk. 55 (1): 106–111. 1938. doi:10.2307/4078506. JSTOR 4078506. (See Jacques le Moyne.)
- "Nicolas Denys, a Forgotten Observer of Birds". The Auk. 56 (3): 283–290. 1939. doi:10.2307/4079049. JSTOR 4079049. (See Nicolas Denys.)
- "A third set of John Abbot bird drawings". The Auk. 59 (4): 563–571. 1942. doi:10.2307/4079466. JSTOR 4079466.
- "The American career of Alexander Wilson, father of American ornithology". Atlantic Naturalist. 8 (2): 60–76. 1952.
- "John Abbot: Pioneer Naturalist of Georgia". The Georgia Historical Quarterly. 41 (2): 143–157. 1957. JSTOR 40577768.

=== Books ===
- The habits and life history of the eastern chipmunk, Tamias striatus lysteri. University of the State of New York. 1928.
- The History of American Ornithology before Audubon. University of Pennsylvania Press.
