= Macaulay Library =

Online wildlife multimedia archive

Coordinates: 42.4798°N 76.4510°W

The Macaulay Library is the world's largest archive of animal media. It includes more than 84 million photographs, 3.2 million audio recordings, and over three hundred thousand videos covering 96 percent of the world's bird species. There is an ever-increasing number of insect, fish, frog, and mammal recordings. The Library is part of Cornell Lab of Ornithology of Cornell University.

== History ==
Arthur Augustus Allen and Peter Paul Kellogg made the first recordings of bird sound on May 18, 1929, in an Ithaca park. They used motion-picture film with synchronized sound to record a song sparrow, a house wren, and a rose-breasted grosbeak. This was the Beginning of Cornell Library of Natural Sounds. Graduate student Albert R. Brand and Cornell undergraduate M. Peter Keane developed recording equipment for use in the open field. In the next two years they had successfully recorded more than 40 species of birds. In 1931, Peter Keane and True McLean (a Cornell professor in electrical engineering) designed and built a parabolic reflector for field recordings of bird songs. They used World War I parabola molds from the Cornell Physics Department. In 1940, Albert R. Brand produced an extensive bird song field guide album "American Bird Songs". The sales of phonograph records of bird sounds remained a key source of income for the Lab of Ornithology since these days.

In 2020 the Internet Bird Collection (IBC) was incorporated into the Macaulay Library, which now hosts all of the content contained in the IBC.

== Recording data ==
The basic data of the modern recordings contains:

1. Species name
2. Date
3. Time of day
4. Location
5. GPS coordinates
6. Behavioral context of sound
7. Natural sound or response to playback. If playback was used announce this on tape.
8. Number of individuals
9. Habitat description
10. Weather (e.g. degree of overcast, air temperature, water temperature (important for amphibian recordings.)
11. Recording equipment-Audio recorder make and model; microphone make and model; if used filter positions
12. Distance to animal

== Name ==
The name of Macaulay Library honors Linda and William (Bill) Macaulay, who donated a significant campaign contribution to fund the new facility (2003) of the library at Sapsucker Woods. Linda Macaulay added also nearly 6,000 individual birdsong recordings of over 2,600 species.

== See also ==
- Scientific collection
