= Albert R. Brand =

American writer and ornithologist (1889–1940)

Albert Rich Brand (October 22, 1889 – March 28, 1940) was an author and innovator in the recording of bird songs. Herbert J. Seligmann wrote Man and Bird Together: A Portrait of Albert R. Brand about him.

== Biography ==
Albert R. Brand was born in New York City.

He was a stockbroker until age 39. At Cornell University he became a graduate student of ornithologist Arthur Augustus Allen. Brand collaborated with Cornell's engineering department to record bird songs, publishing two books accompanied by photographs. His first guide book about bird songs was accompanied by a phonograph record of a few dozen calls. He followed it up with a sequel with even more recordings.

He also recorded frogs. Sales of phonograph records of bird sounds were a key source of income for the Cornell Lab of Ornithology.

He died at his home in Ithaca, New York on March 28, 1940.

== Bibliography ==
- Songs of Wild Birds, T. Nelson and Sons (1934)
- More Songs of Wild Birds (1936)

== See also ==
- Macaulay Library, Cornell's library archive of animal sounds
