= Dragon Fusuma =

Sliding-panel doors completed by Nagasawa Rosetsu

- Japanese: 龍図襖
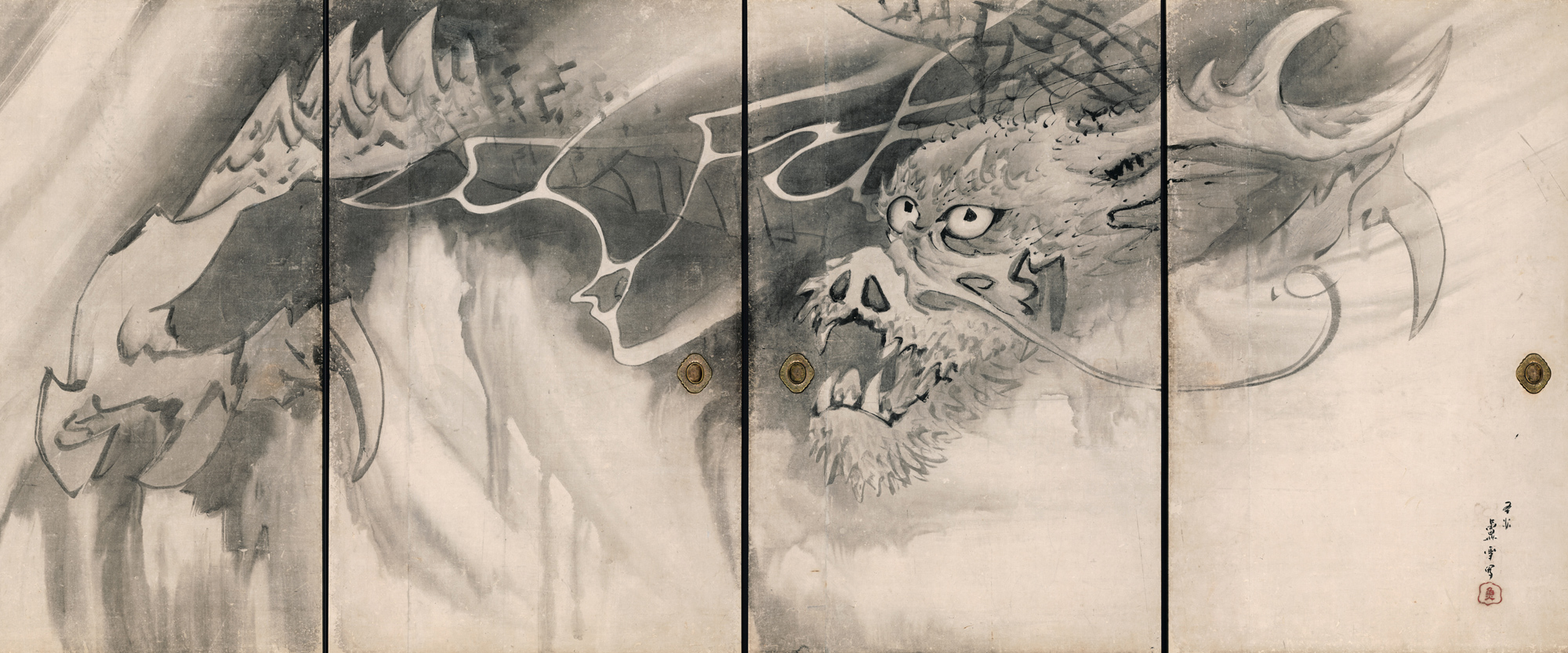
- Artist: Nagasawa Rosetsu
- Year: 1786
- Subject: Dragon on Fusuma
- Dimensions: Right Four Sides: 183.5 x 115.5 cm each Left Two Sides: 180.0 x 87.0 cm each
- Designation: Important Cultural Property (Japan)
- Location: Kushimoto Ōkyo Rosetsu Art Museum, Muryō-ji, Kushimoto, Wakayama Prefecture

The Dragon Fusuma (龍図襖, Ryū zu Fusuma) is an Edo period sliding door ink painting created in 1786 by artist Nagasawa Rosetsu, a student of Maruyama Ōkyo of the Maruyama school in Kyoto. A counterpart to the Tiger Fusuma, which was painted adjacent to it, it is classified as an Important Cultural Property (重要文化財, jūyō bunkazai) and is housed at the Kushimoto Ōkyo Rosetsu Art Museum, a part of the Zen temple Muryō-ji located in Kushimoto, Wakayama.

== Background ==
In 1786, Rosetsu left his residence of Kyoto at the behest of Ōkyo and conducted commissions for Muryō-ji, Sodo-ji, and Joju-ji. Local legend has it that he completed the Tiger Fusuma and the Dragon Fusuma in one night.

== Description ==
Corresponding to the Tiger Fusuma on the opposite of Muryō-ji's Buddhist altar room, in the East Hall the Dragon Fusuma is composed of six panels, with the main detail on the four panels of the fusuma. The front half of the dragon's body dominates the canvas, with only the front claw and its head peeping out of the mist, staring back, depicted in black ink, as to convey the size and scale of the dragon.

Prior to his stay in Muryō-ji, Rosetsu completed another Dragon Fusuma panel at Saiko-ji, in Matsue, Shimane Prefecture, though in Wakayama, he was able scale up and produce his own independent style that diverges from his school's work along with his previous styles.

== Exhibition ==
The pair, as iconic pieces of Rosetsu's work have been frequently exhibited together when taken abroad, including multiple exhibitions around Japan, such as the Aichi Prefectural Museum of Art in 2017.

From 6 September to 4 November 2018, both panels from Muryō-ji spent time abroad on special exhibit at the Rietberg Museum in Zürich as part of a retrospective exhibit of his works.

Subsequently, from 7 October to 3 December 2023, the first retrospective of his works in Osaka University including the panels were put of display at the Nakanoshima Museum of Art.
