= Herbert J. Seligmann =

American photographer, author and journalist

Herbert Jacob Seligmann (1891 – March 3, 1984) was an American photographer, author and journalist known for his writings on civil rights issues, African Americans, bigotry, the U.S. occupation of Haiti, and the rise of Nazism in Europe. He also wrote about well known artists such as Georgia O'Keeffe and John Marin, and about writers like D. H. Lawrence, Albert R. Brand, and J. Hendrix McLane. His review of Lady Chatterley's Lover appeared in The New York Sun but was removed from later editions because of the obscenity ban. His book on Lawrence was the first by an American. Seligmann was the first publicity director for the NAACP between 1919 and 1932, and was interviewed about the group's history on WNYC's radio program for African American subject matter. He also worked for the Jewish Telegraph Agency.

== Early life ==
Seligmann was of Jewish ancestry. He graduated from Harvard University. In 1918 he traveled around the Southern United States and wrote about African Americans willing and able to defend themselves. His first marriage was to Lilias H. MacLane, a dancer, and his second to Lise née Rueff Seligmann.

== Professional work ==
He worked for various periodicals including The New Republic, The New York Evening Post, The New York Globe, Down East and The New York Tribune. He also worked for a couple of Jewish organizations, including the Joint Distribution Committee. He took photographs of Jews in Europe in the period after World War I. In 1920 he wrote about the "menace of race hatred" in Europe.

=== Civil rights work ===
Seligmann's 1920 book, The Negro Faces America, described an American psychosis when it came to skin color with economic and media difficulties exacerbating the problem. Basing his conclusions on first-hand looks at areas of where riots occurred, Seligmann makes the case that race colors all aspects of American life that disadvantages and disenfranchises African Americans and lays the conditions for race riots. Excerpts from the book were published in The Crisis. In his review in The Journal of Negro History, D. A. Lane (Jr) writes that the very fact that such a book was written gives hope for a new dawn in race relations in the United States. A review in The New Republic, expressed uneasiness with the "aggressive insistence upon race inequality and the right of intermarriage", a statement which, in a 2015 opinion in the same magazine, was called out as being "filtered through the magazine's privileged white writers" and of "justifying racism". The phrase "New Negro" emerged during the Harlem Renaissance. H. L. Mencken faulted the book for a lack of criticism of blacks and for idealizing them as a group instead of addressing issues Southern whites actually experienced in their encounters. During the United States occupation of Haiti in 1920, Seligmann reported on atrocities by occupying American forces.

In 1929 he wrote about the first 20 years of NAACP history. He nominated Eddie Tolan for the NAACP's Spingarn Medal in 1932.

In 1939, Seligmann published an expose on the Nazi Party and their views on race. Franz Boas wrote the introduction to his book on Nazi race theories.

== Photography ==
Alfred Stieglitz, a friend of Seligmann's, photographed him producing a palladium print. Seligmann transcribed conversations and comments by Stieglitz, publishing them as Alfred Stieglitz Talking in 1966.

The Cleveland Museum of Art has a gelatin silver print photograph Seligmann photographed of the Brooklyn Bridge.

A collection of his photographs of Romanian Jews taken from 1936 to 1938 was published in 2016. Eight of his sketches are part of the John Marin collection at the Smithsonian.

George Santayana wrote to him in 1911 about his thesis.

Seligman wrote for Down East in the 1950s including an entry on Marsden Hartley.

== Bibliography ==
- The Negro Faces America, Harper & Brothers (1920)
- "The Menace of Race Hatred", The Atlantic (March, 1920)
- D.H. Lawrence: An American Interpretation (1924)
- Sun and Tides (1932), a book of poems
- Race Against Man (1939)
- Man and Bird Together, a memoir of Albert R. Brand
- Voyages
- A South Carolina Independent of the 1880's: J. Hendrix McLane (1965)
- Alfred Stieglitz Talking (1966)
