= Arnold Mallis =

American entomologist

Arnold Mallis (15 October 1910 – 16 January 1984) was an American professor of entomology. He worked as an extension entomologist in Pennsylvania State University and was the author of a popular Handbook of Pest Control first published in 1945 that continues to be revised and published.

== Life ==
Mallis was born in New York. The family moved to California in 1927 and Mallis went to the University of Southern California in 1928 with the idea of training to be a dentist. He however gave up due to the Great Depression and worked in a shipping company for two years. He obtained a BS in 1934 from the University of California, Berkeley followed by an MS in 1939. He then worked in the US Forest Service. During the Second World War, he worked on malaria with the US Public Health Service. He was a Hercules Fellow at the University of Delaware around 1944. He worked on screening insecticides in the Gulf Oil Company in Pittsburgh from 1945 to 1958 following which he joined Pennsylvania State University as an extension entomologist. He retired in 1975. Mallis' most well-known contributions was his Handbook of Pest Control on which he worked from 1938 to be published first in 1945 followed by several editions. He also wrote a book on the biographies of American Entomologists (1971).
