= Jacob Bonneau =

British artist

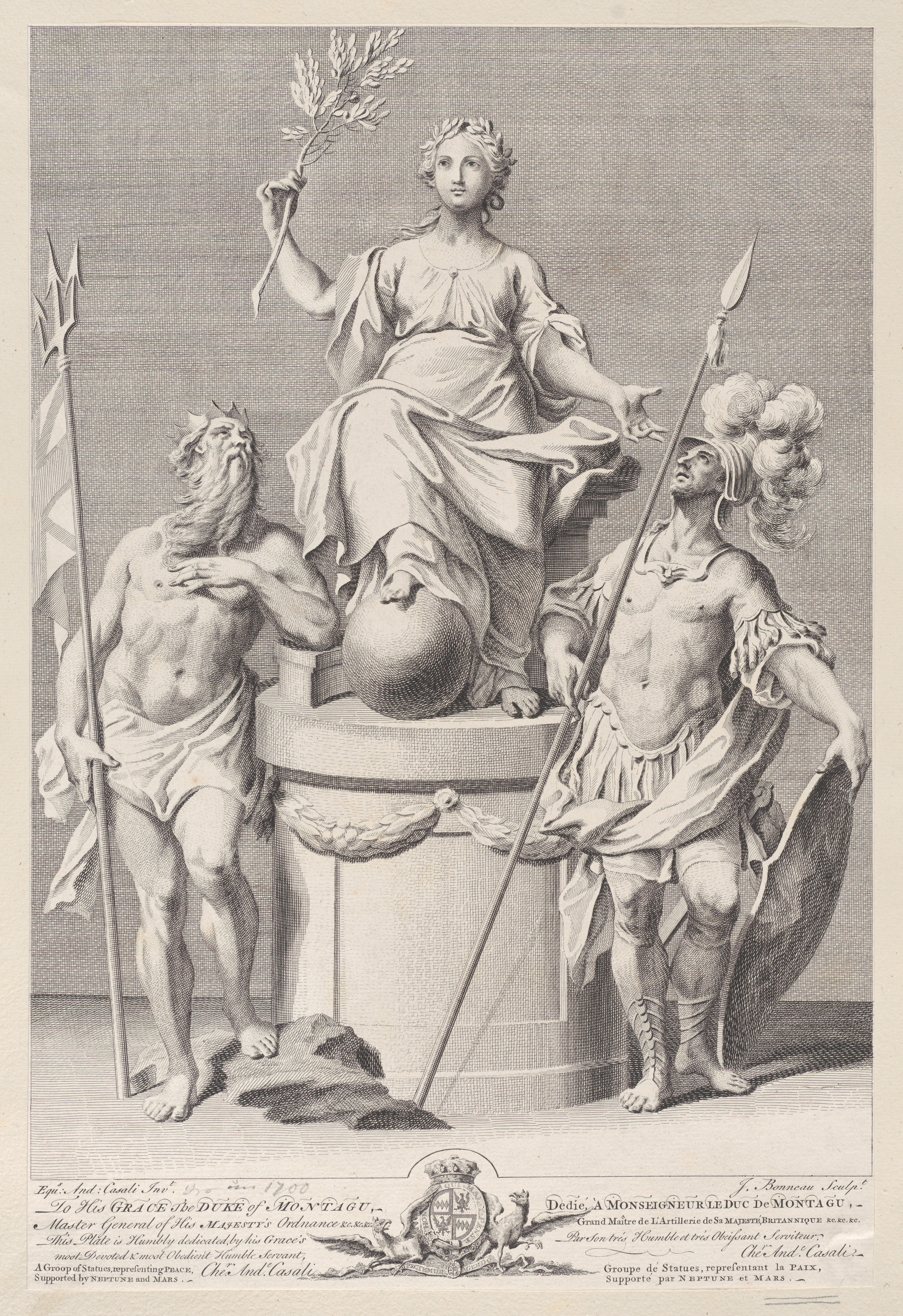
Jacob Bonneau engraving titled "Group of statues representing Peace"

Jacob Bonneau (c. 1717 – 18 March 1786) was an English artist, illustrator, and art instructor. His chief medium was watercolour.

Bonneau was baptized on 16 July 1717 at the Huguenot Church in Spitalfields, Middlesex. He was the son of a French engraver, Pierre Bonneau, and his wife Elizabeth Gorain. In 1765–1778 he exhibited landscapes at the rooms of the Society of British Artists, of which he was a member. In 1770 he exhibited a water-colour drawing, St. John, at the Royal Academy and from that year until 1781 he was occasionally represented there by drawings, generally landscapes with figures. His principal occupation was that of a teacher of drawing and perspective. One of his students was John Abbot, who went on to become a noted entomological illustrator. He died at Kentish Town on 18 March 1786.
