= Arthur A. Allen =

American ornithologist

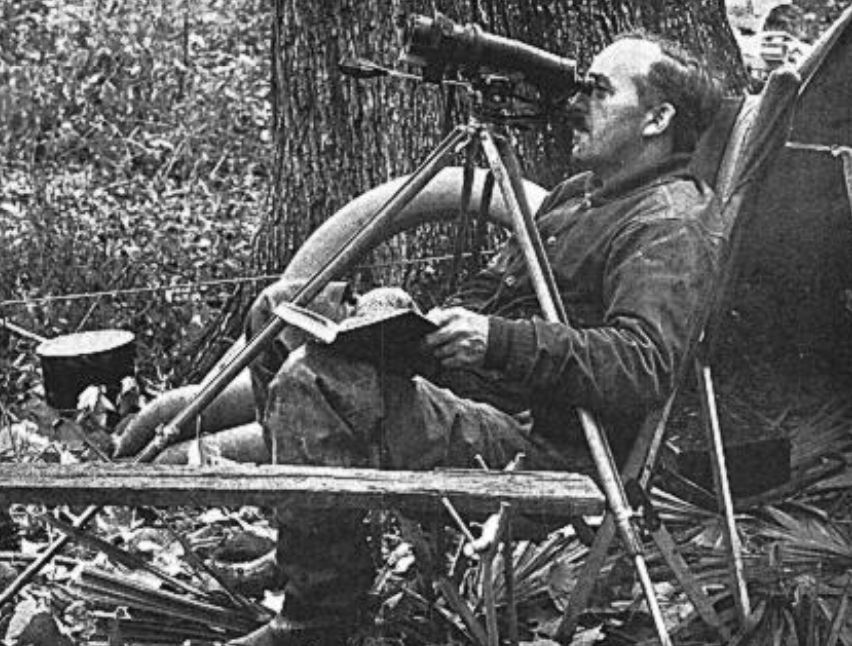
- Allen observing ivory-billed woodpeckers on the Singer tract in 1935
- Born: Arthur Augustus Allen; 28 December 1885; Buffalo, New York, U.S.
- Died: January 17, 1964 (aged 78)
- Education: Cornell University (BA, MA, PhD)
- Known for: Ornithology
- Spouse: Elsa G. Allen
- Children: 5

Arthur Augustus Allen (28 December 1885 – 17 January 1964) was an American professor of ornithology at Cornell University. Smithsonian has credited him for the transition of ornithology from being focused on killing and collecting birds, to being focused on observing and protecting them.

== Early life and education ==
Allen was born in Buffalo, New York, the son of Daniel Williams Allen and Anna née Moore. He studied at Cornell University, where he obtained his Bachelor of Arts in 1907, his Master of Arts in 1908 and his Ph.D. in 1911. His thesis is entitled "The Red-Winged Blackbird: A Study in the Ecology of a Cattail Marsh".

== Career ==
=== Fieldwork ===
From 1911 to 1912 he went on an expedition to Colombia. In 1935 Allen led an expedition to the Singer Tract in Louisiana to search for ivory-billed woodpeckers. They did discover some, in what was to turn out to be the last documented, definite sighting, including photographs and audio. In the early 2000s there was a flurry of excitement at possible sightings in the same region, but controversy surrounds how sure the sightings were.

Allen published an ornithological history in 1933 under the title Fifty Years' Progress of American Ornithology, 1883–1933. He was dedicated to promoting the study of birds to a wide audience, in his books, films and public lectures. His Book of Bird Life (1930, reissued in 1961) was a well-written introduction to ornithology for its time. He founded the Wildlife Society in 1936, leading the organization from 1938 to 1939.

After retiring from his position at Cornell, he was a public lecturer for the National Audubon Society from 1953 to 1959.

=== Cornell University ===
From 1912 to 1916, Allen was appointed as an instructor in zoology at Cornell. He became an assistant professor in 1916 and a professor in 1926. He continued his career at Cornell until his retirement in 1953. It has been estimated that over 10,000 students took his courses, including over 100 doctoral students, at a time when Cornell was the only institution to offer advanced degrees in ornithology. He worked on what eventually became the independent Cornell Lab of Ornithology in 1955.

Allen also conducted pioneering studies on recording bird songs. In 1929, he and Peter Paul Kellogg took the first sound recordings of wild birds, in a park in Ithaca. This would be the first of many experiments in field recording. In 1932, Allen and Kellogg filmed and made sound recordings of a male Ruffed Grouse drumming. It was the first ornithological study to use film and recorded sound, and proved that the grouse produces the drumming sound not by hitting itself, but by "drumming" on the air.

Albert R. Brand, one of Allen's graduate students, created the first record album of bird songs (for the phonograph) in 1932. Allen would go on to release five bird song albums with Kellogg, and the duo would also release an album of frog calls in 1953. Many of Allen's recordings are still available on the Macaulay Library website.

== Personal life ==
Allen married fellow Cornell alum and ornithologist Elsa Guerdrum in 1913. They had five children.

== Works ==
=== Albums ===
All were recorded with Peter Paul Kellogg and released through Cornell University Records.

- Voices of the Night: The Calls of 34 Frogs and Toads of America. 1953.
- Songbirds of America. 1954.
- American Bird Songs: Volume One. 1955.
- American Bird Songs: Volume Two. 1955.
- Bird Songs in Your Garden. 1961.

=== Books ===
- Book of Bird Life. 1931. New York: D. Van Nostrand Company.
- American Bird Biographies. 1935. Ithaca, New York: Comstock Publishing Company.
- The Golden Plover and Other Birds. 1939. Ithaca, New York: Comstock Publishing Company.
