= Tiger Fusuma =

Sliding door panel by Rosetsu depicting a Tiger (ICP property of Japan)

- Japanese: 虎図襖
- Artist: Nagasawa Rosetsu
- Year: 1786
- Subject: Tiger on Fusuma
- Dimensions: Two Right Sides: 180.0×87.0 cm each; Left Four Sides: 183.5 x 115.5 cm each
- Designation: Important Cultural Property (Japan)
- Location: Kushimoto Ōkyo Rosetsu Art Museum, Muryō-ji, Kushimoto, Wakayama Prefecture

The Tiger Fusuma (虎図襖, Tora zu Fusuma) is an Edo Period sliding door ink painting created in 1786 by artist Nagasawa Rosetsu, a student of Maruyama Ōkyo in the Maruyama school based in Kyoto. The painting is considered to be a masterpiece of Edo Period art, and also a divergence from his teacher's style. Housed in the Zen temple of Muryō-ji in the town of Kushimoto, Wakayama Prefecture, it is classified as an Important Cultural Property (重要文化財, jūyō bunkazai).

== Background ==
At Muryō-ji, local legend states that he completed the Tiger Fusuma with a companion piece, the Dragon Fusuma in the span of one night.

== Description ==
The Tiger Fusuma decorates the left side of the main hall of Muryō-ji's Buddhist altar room, composed of six total panels. The lower-right to the right side depicts ground in the form of a triangular formation.

The centerpiece is the tiger, with an arc-shaped body from the eyes, the torso, the hind limbs and tail that corresponds to the Dragon Fusuma on the opposite side of the room.

Depicted as fierce, the tiger is also anthropomorphized and also softened with more kitten-like features. It is likely that Rosetsu modelled his tiger on those on display at a private zoo, as tigers were known to be Chinese imports during the Edo period. It's divergence from depictions in Chinese painting indicates the development of his own style.

Vigorous brushstrokes are used in addition to fingerpainting or shitoga.

The painting signature reads "Hei Hyōkei sha" (copied by "Hyōkei of Kyoto") with the seal of "Gyo".

== Exhibition ==
In 1981, the painting was exhibited at the Royal Academy of Arts in London, where it gained reception as a "masterpiece".

The paint saw further exhibition outside of the temple in Japan in 2000, 2011, and 2017, before once again, being displayed abroad at the Rietberg Museum in Zürich, Switzerland.

From 7 October to 3 December 2023, both the Tiger and the Dragon Fusuma are exhibited together in the first retrospective exhibit in Osaka for Rosetsu at the Nakanoshima Museum of Art.
