= Julien-Honoré-Germain d'Aubuisson =

French painter (1786–1860)

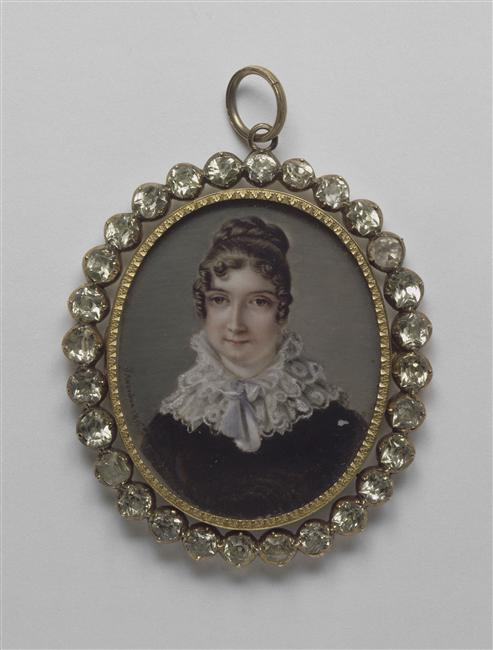
Stéphanie de Beauharnais, 1816.

Julien Honoré Germain, Marquis d'Aubuisson (1786–1860), was a French painter.

Aubuisson was born in Toulouse, son of the Marquis Jean-Germain-Marie d'Aubuisson and Marie-Thérèse de Rigaud. He was a member of the Knights Hospitaller, and married miss Besaucelle in 1805. Aubuisson was a student of Jacques-Louis David. He painted and exhibited from 1812 to 1822 in the Paris Salon, several poetical and historical pictures; namely, 'Paris taking leave of Helen,' 'Hector forcing Paris to quit Helen,' 'Alexander and Bucephalus,' and the 'Punishment of Hebe.'
