= Nagasawa Rosetsu =

Japanese Artist of the Edo Period

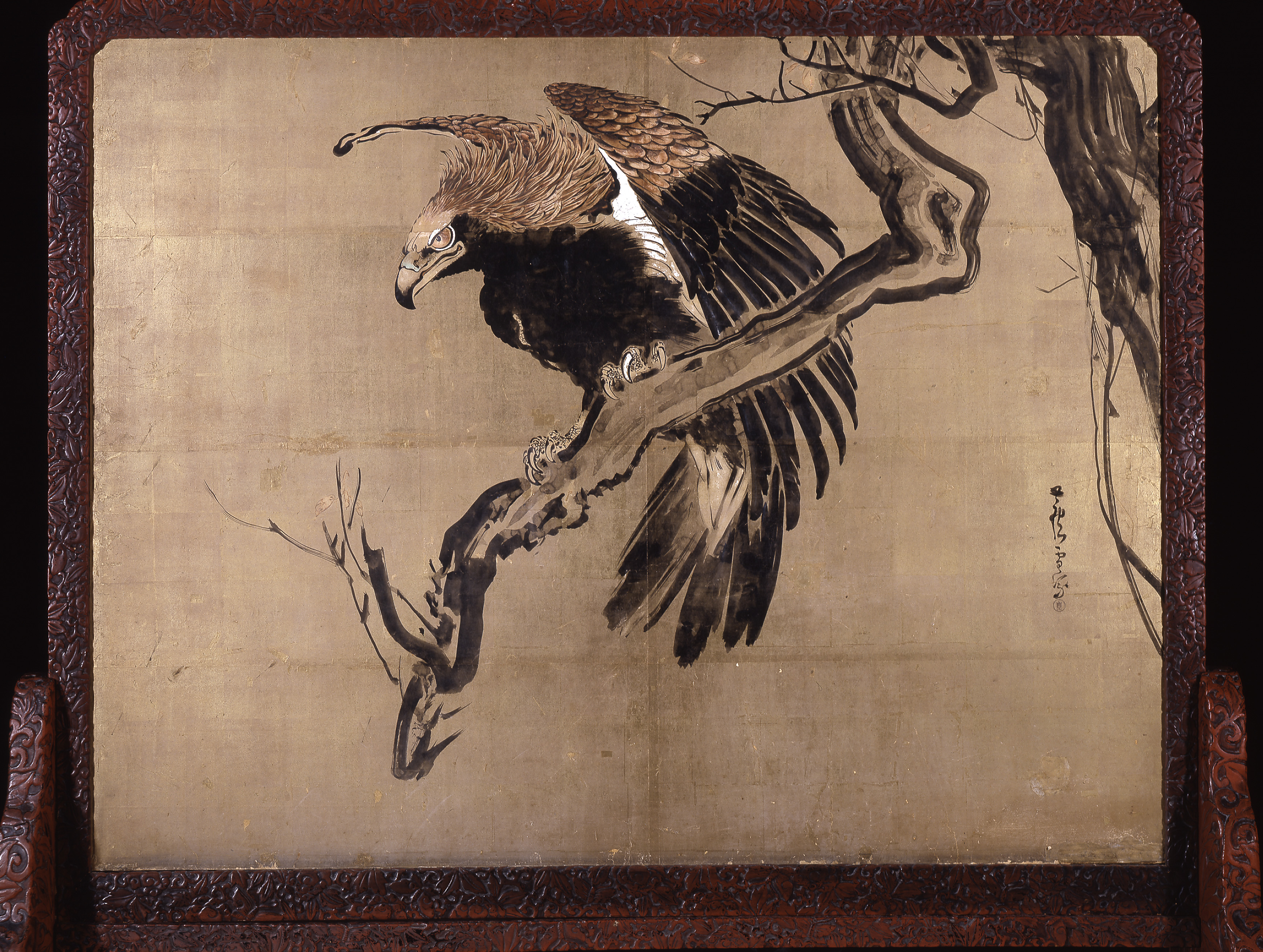
- Eagle on a Branch, painted on a screen. Edo Period, 18th century. Indianapolis Museum of Art.
- Born: 1754; Yamashiro, Kyoto Prefecture, Japan
- Died: 1799 (aged 44–45)

Nagasawa Rosetsu (長沢芦雪; 1754–1799) was a Japanese painter during the Edo period. A disciple of the Maruyama School, he was known for his versatile artistic style. He was born to the family of a low-ranking samurai. He studied with Maruyama Ōkyo in Kyoto.

== Biography ==
There are conflicting versions of Rosetsu's family origins, but the most credible appears to be that he was born to the family of a low-ranking samurai named Uesugi Hikouemon in the area of modern Kyoto Prefecture. Upon establishing himself as an artist, he changed his name from Uesugi to Nagasawa. He moved to Kyoto in 1781, where he became a student of Maruyama Ōkyo.

Rosetsu was married and had four children, all of whom died in childhood. He adopted his pupil Nagasawa Roshū.

Rosetsu died in 1799, allegedly by murder. He was said to have been poisoned, although others claim he committed suicide. He, his children, and his pupil are buried in a Kyoto cemetery belonging to the Pure Land Sect, although Rosetsu was a lay student of Zen.

== Works ==
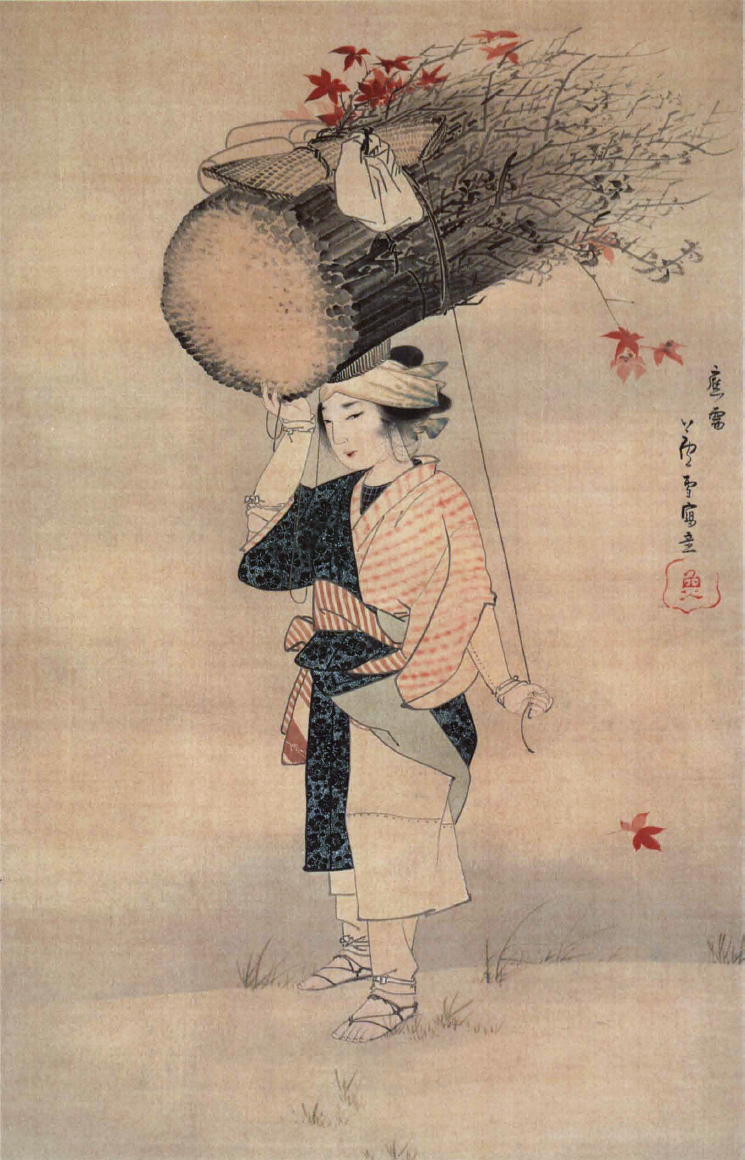
A Woman of Ōhara Carrying Firewood

Rosetsu's early period works are in the style of Maruyama Ōkyo, although critics agree that the pupil's skill quickly surpassed his master's. Finally, they had a falling out and Rosetsu left the school. After the break, he worked under the patronage of the feudal lord of Yodo and accepted commissions at several temples.

Rosetsu's paintings fall into two very clearly defined categories, with no halfway stage in between. On the one hand, there are those of studied finish, and on the other, those--the great majority--that were clearly the work of a very few minutes of intense activity, whatever the preliminary thought and calculation. We are inclined to think of the first type as early and even untypical, but in fact Rosetsu seems to have executed carefully finished paintings at all stages of his career.

In his work, which is reminiscent of earlier Zen painting, while the moon is left white, the night sky, mountains, and pine trees are depicted with gradations of India ink.

His work was extensively forged in the Meiji period.

His works are kept in many museums worldwide, including the Dallas Museum of Art, the Walters Art Museum, the Indianapolis Museum of Art, the Princeton University Art Museum, the Harvard Art Museums, the Los Angeles County Museum of Art, the University of Michigan Museum of Art, the British Museum, the Brooklyn Museum, the Tokyo Fuji Art Museum, the Frances Lehman Loeb Art Center at Vassar College, the Cleveland Museum of Art, BAMPFA, the Birmingham Museum of Art, the Minneapolis Institute of Art, the Seattle Art Museum, and the Asian Art Museum.

== Gallery ==
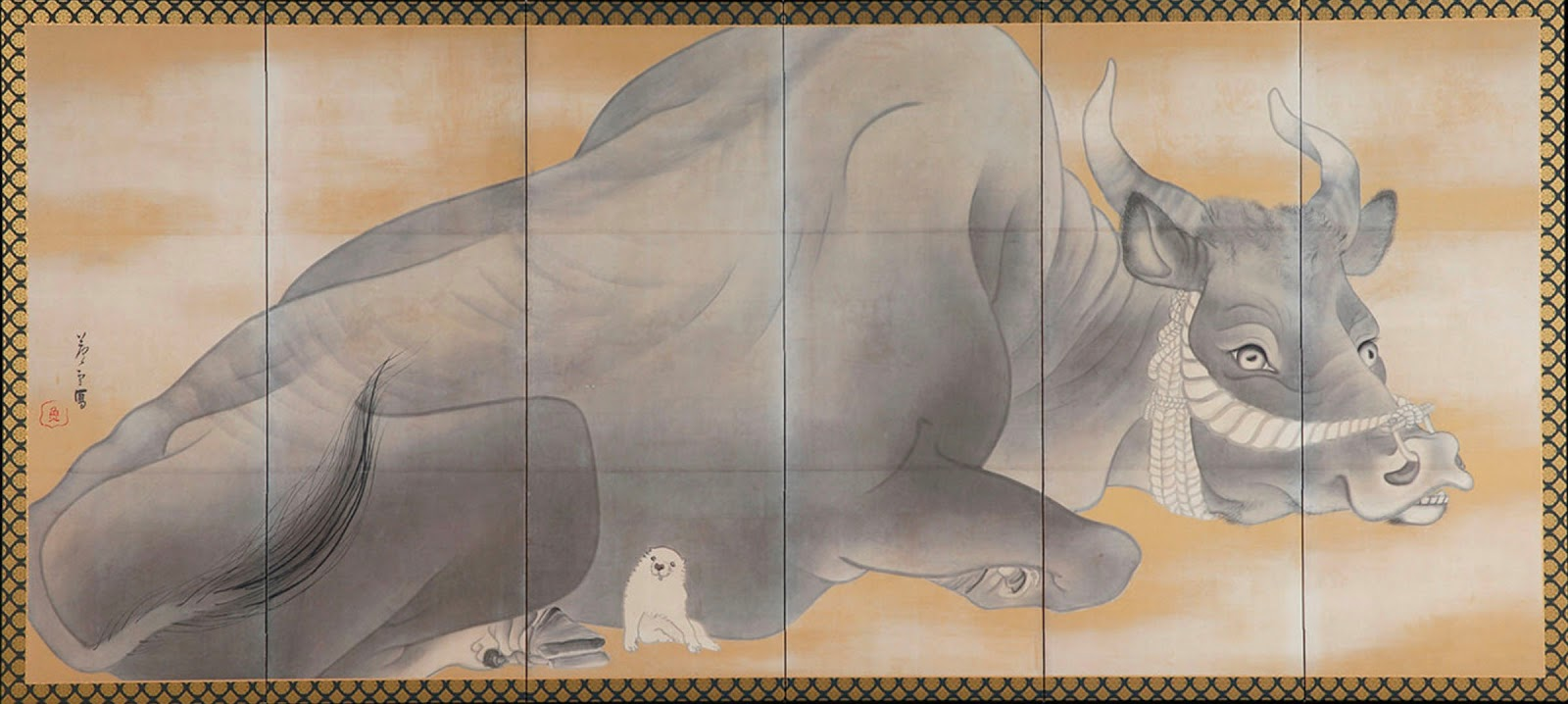
White Elephant and Black Bull (left panel)

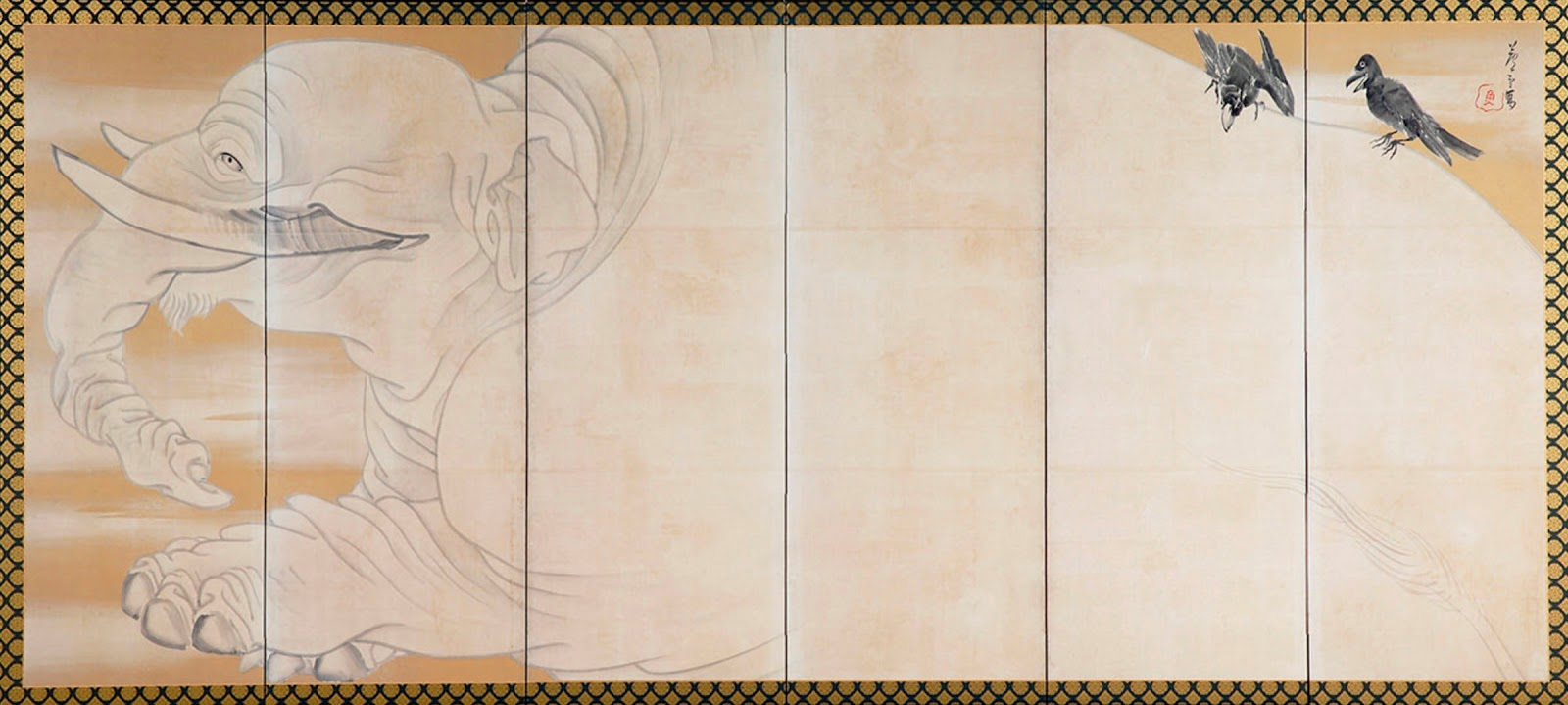
White Elephant and Black Bull (right panel)

Tiger, Important Cultural Property

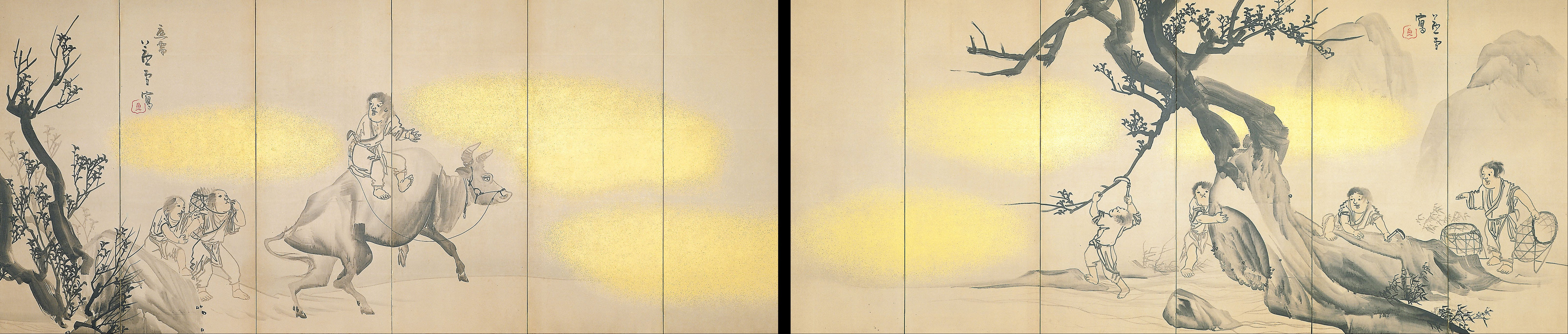
Herd Boys

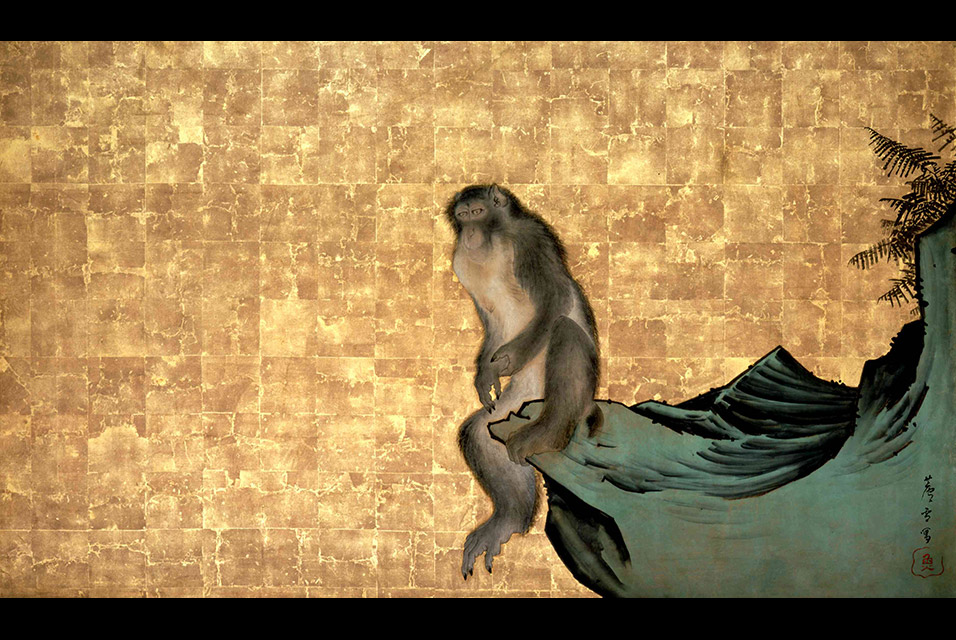
Monkey on a Rock
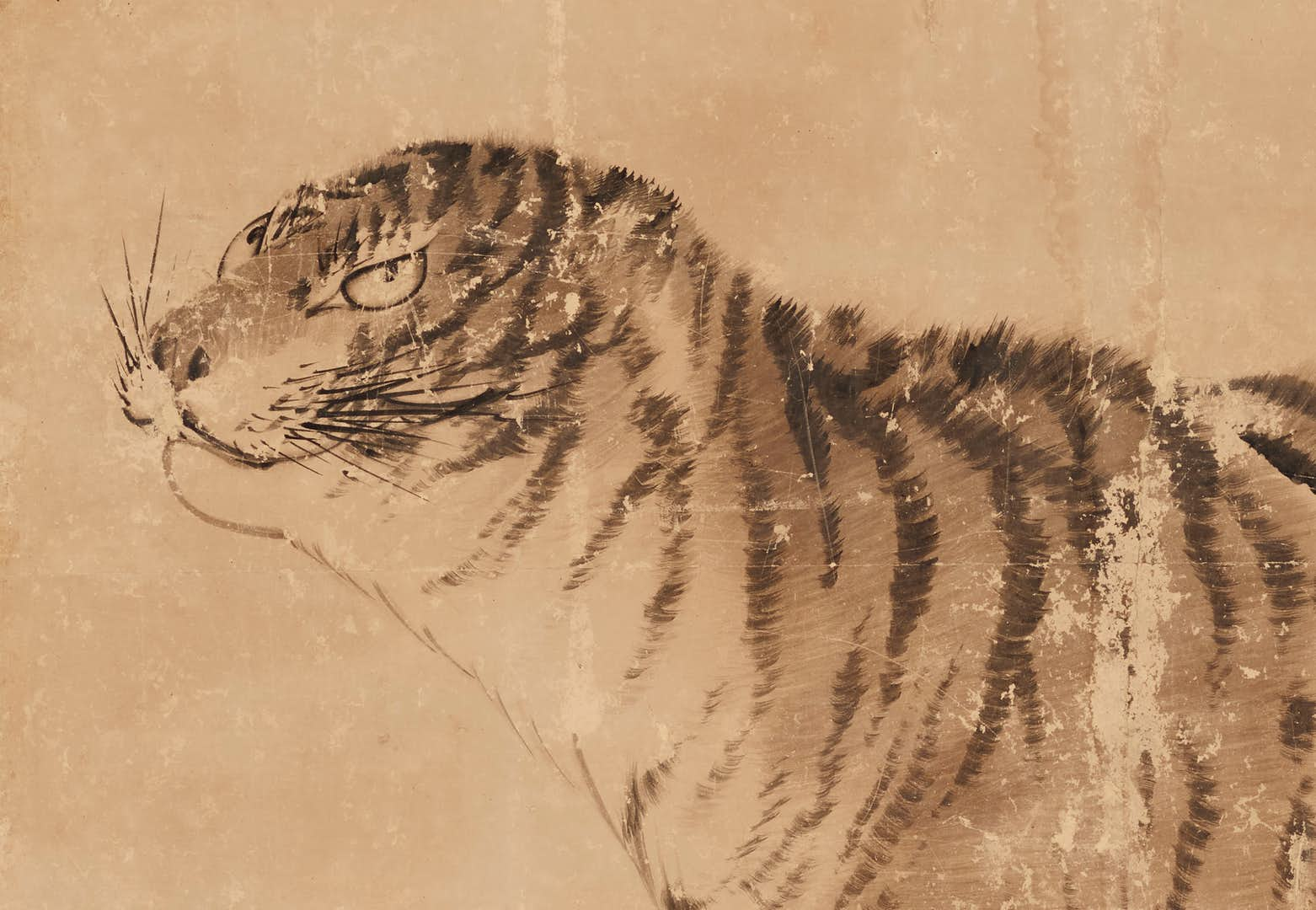
Detail of a Tiger

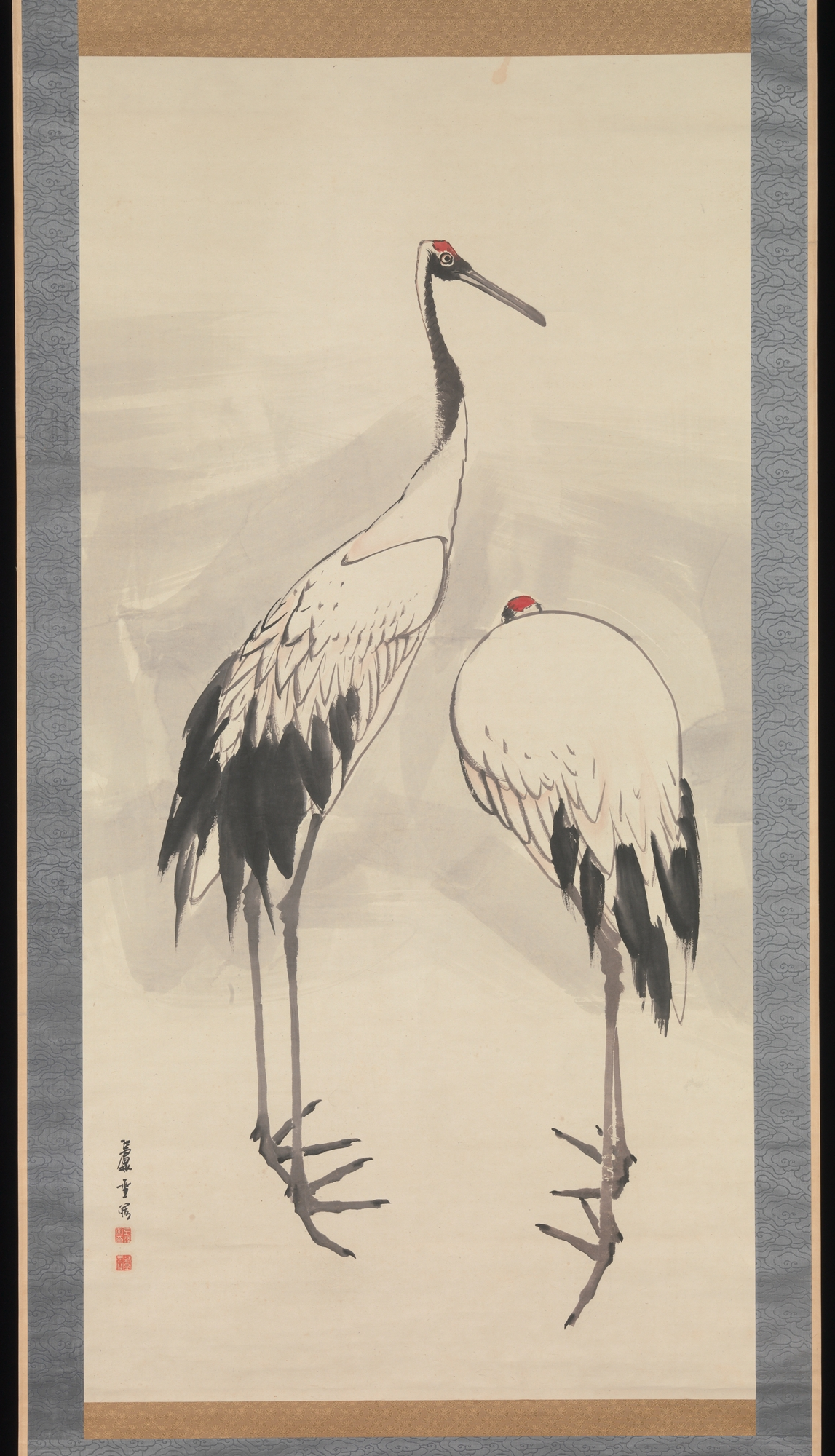
Cranes

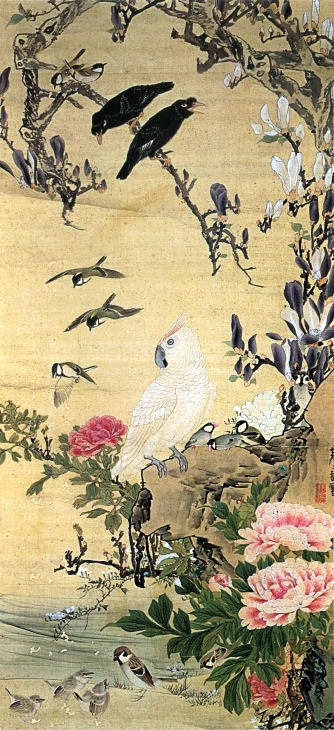
Bird Amid Magnolia and Peony

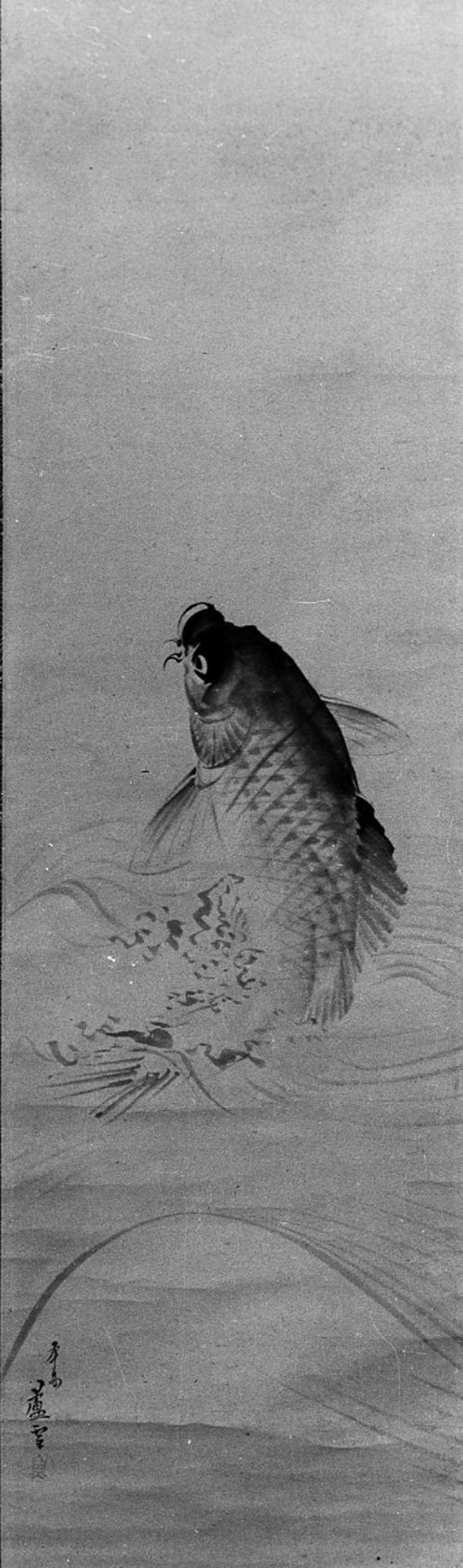
Carp

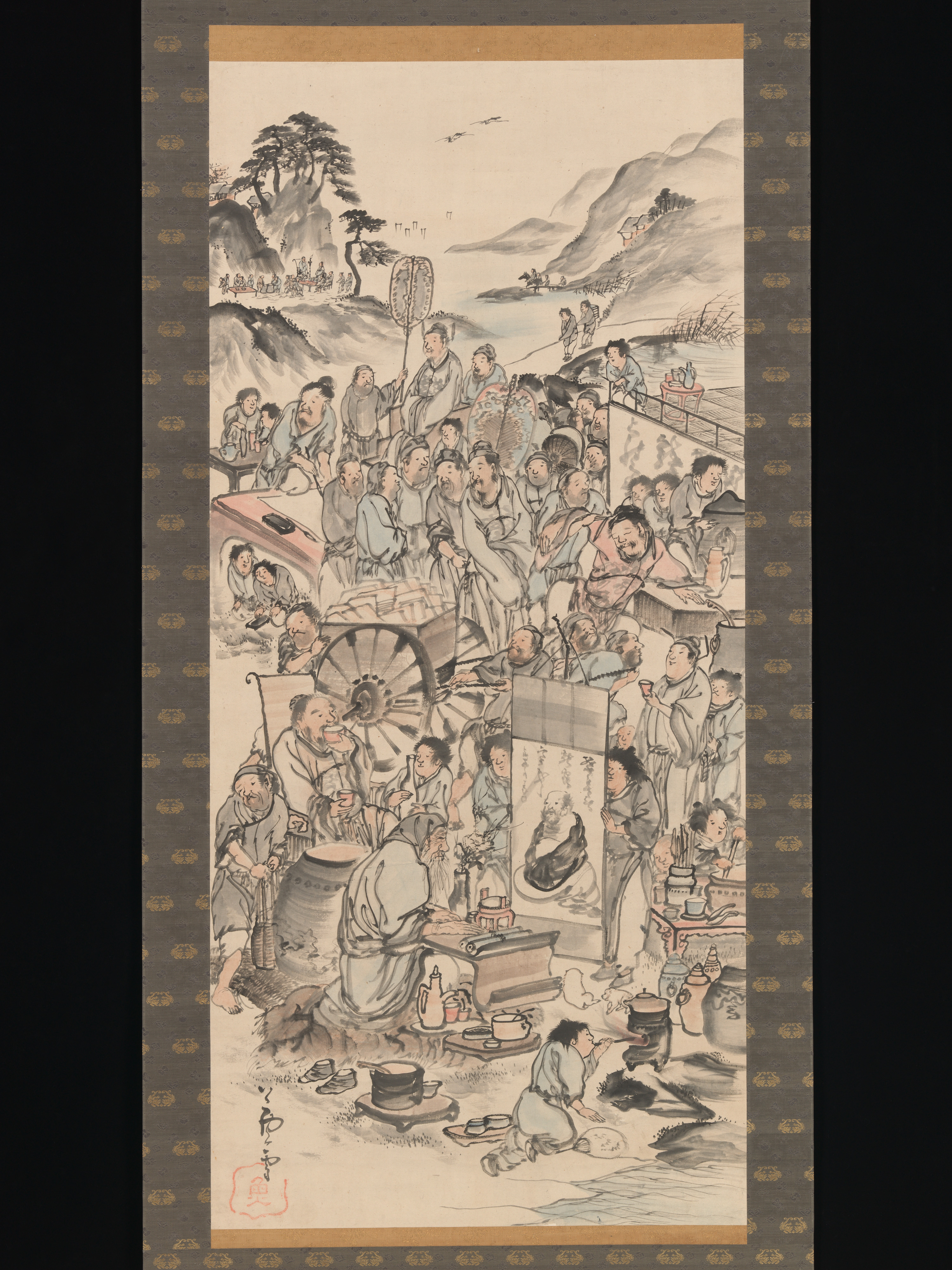
Drinking Festival of the Eight Immortals

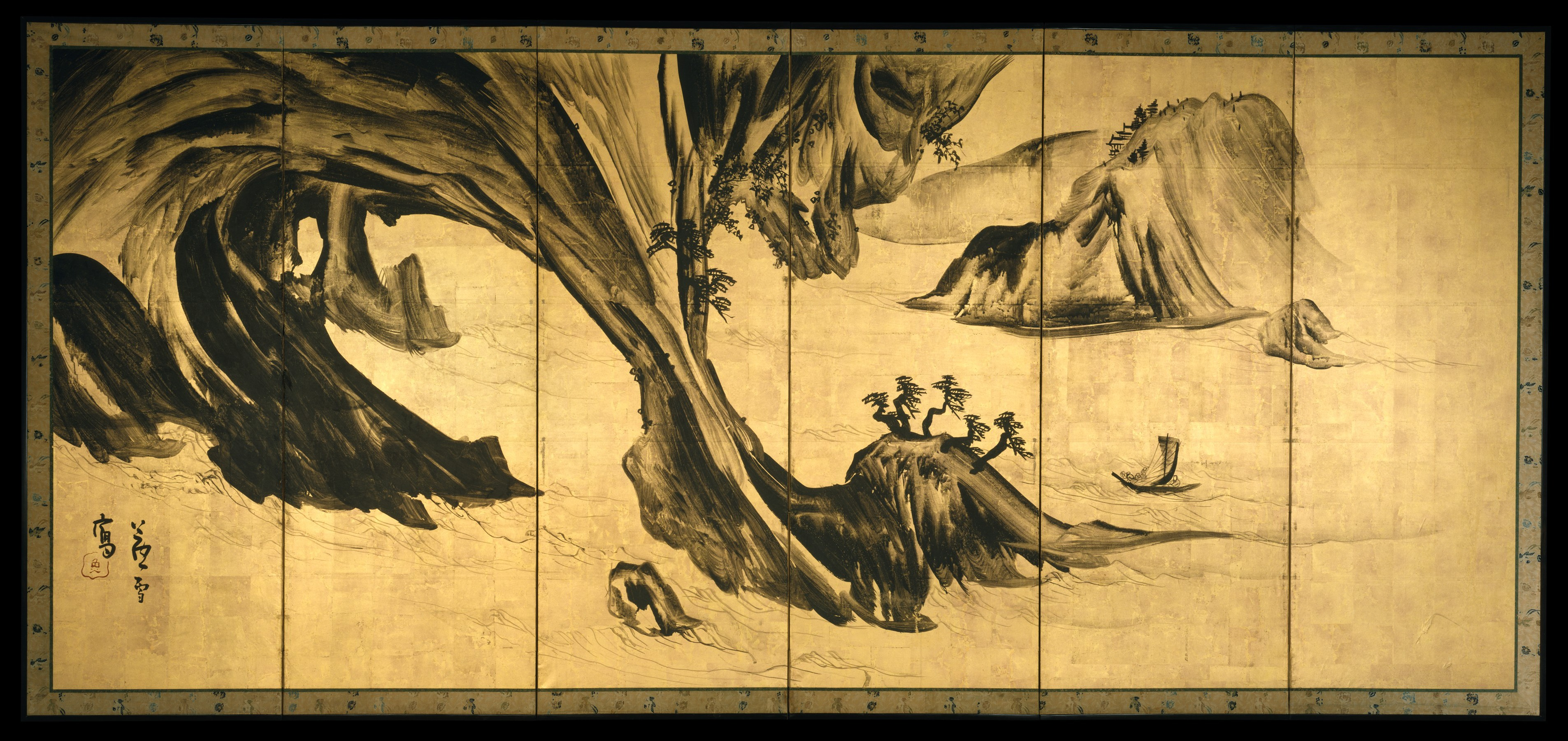
Landscapes with the Chinese Literati Su Shi and Tao Qian, section one

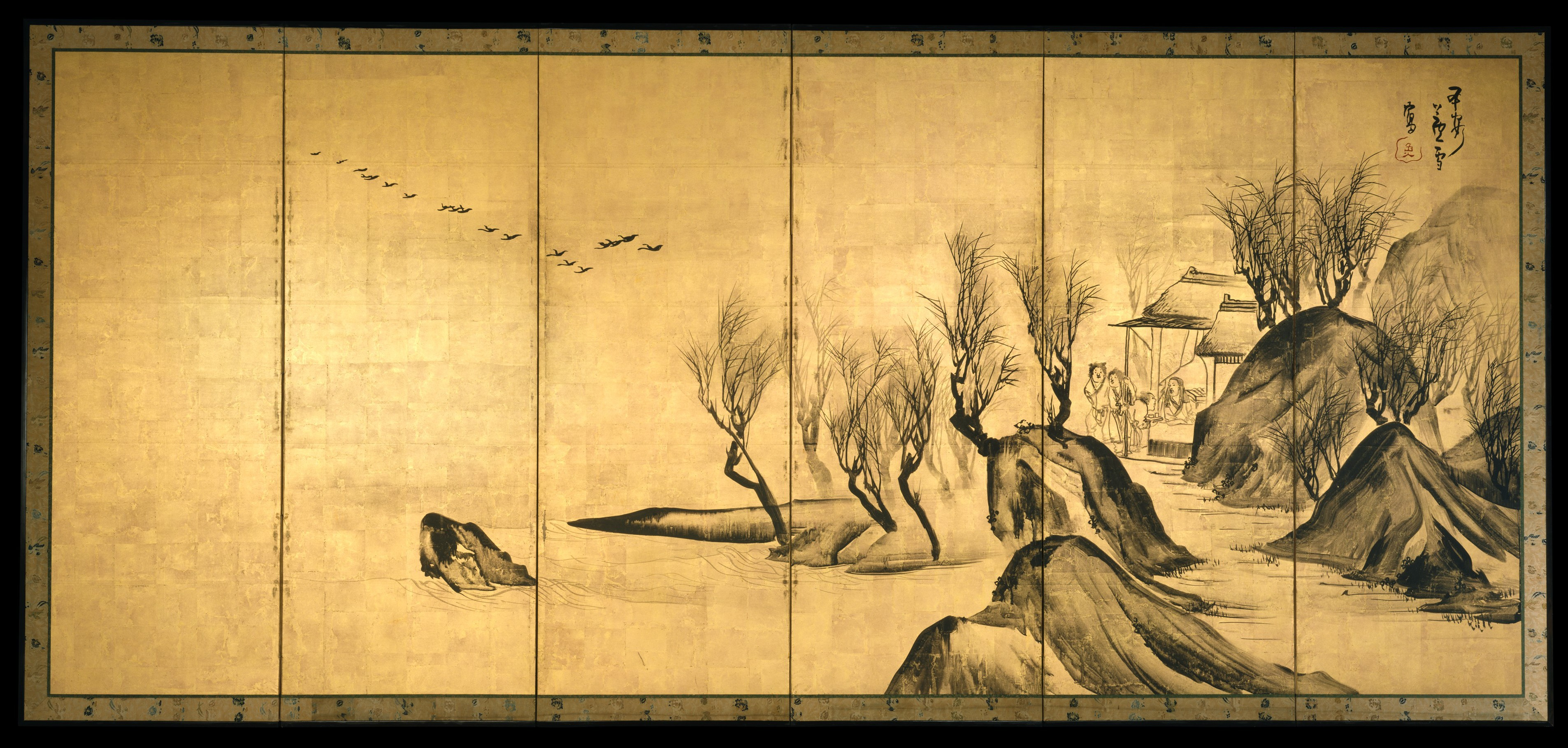
Landscapes with the Chinese Literati Su Shi and Tao Qian, section two

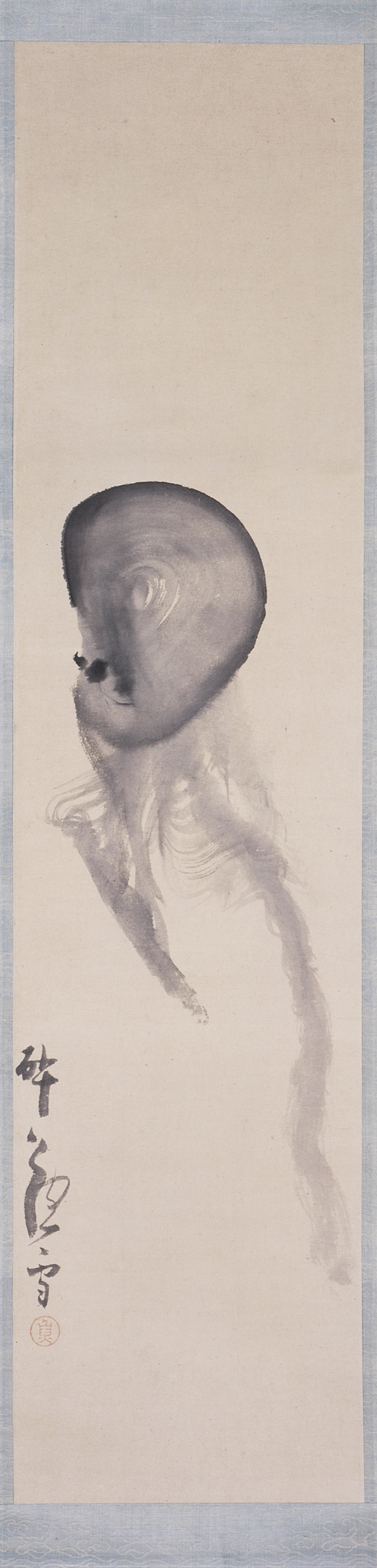
A Jellyfish Like the Moon

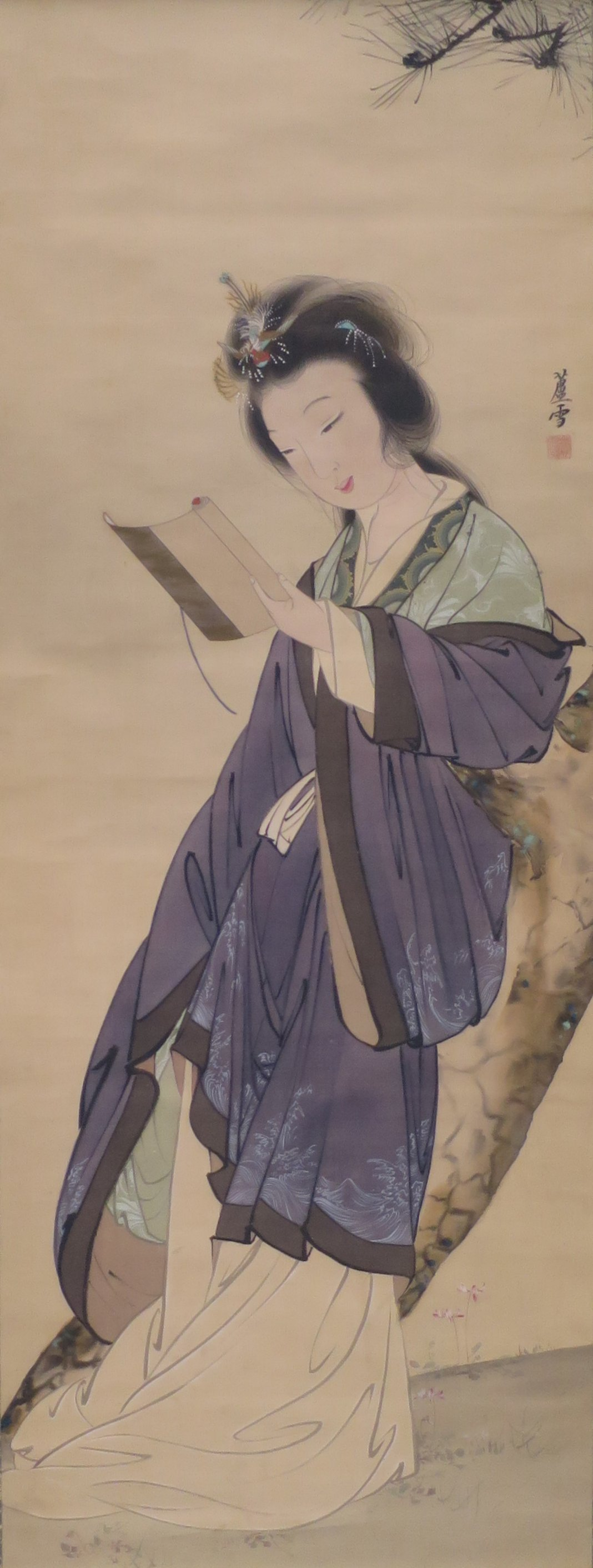
Chinese Beauty

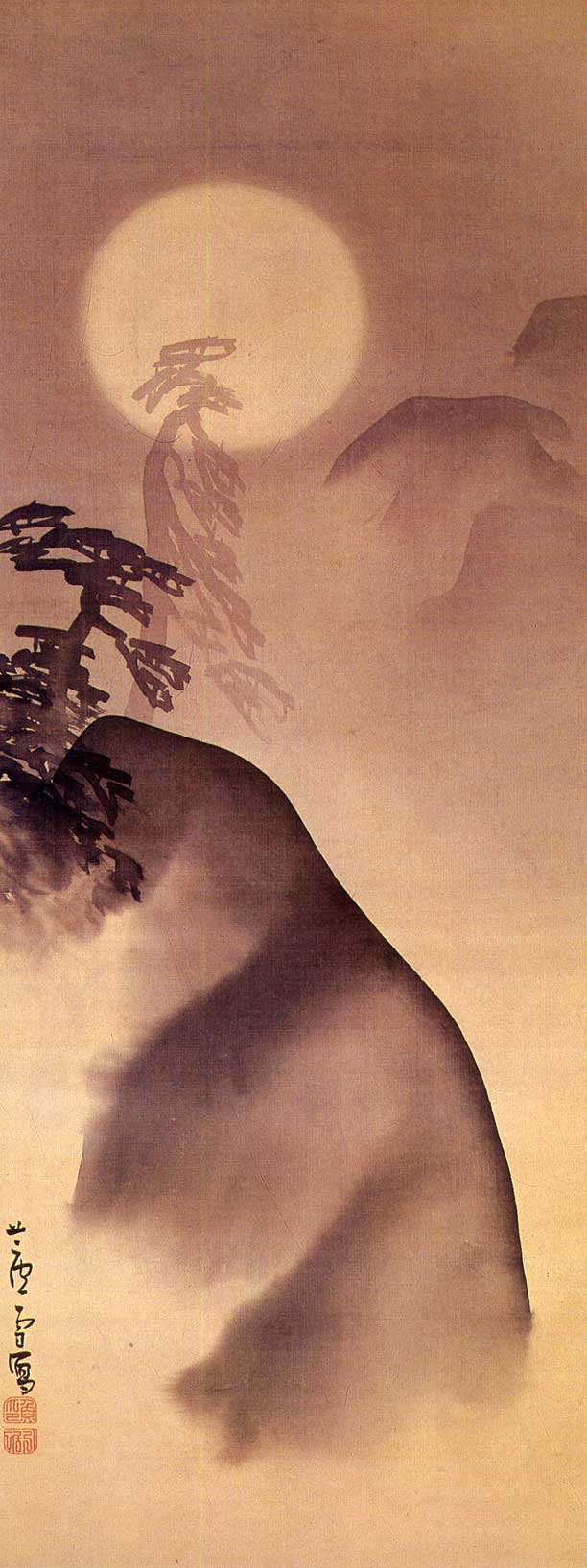
Landscape in the Moonlight. 18th century. Ink on silk, 98×35.3cm. Egawa Museum of Art, Hyogo.

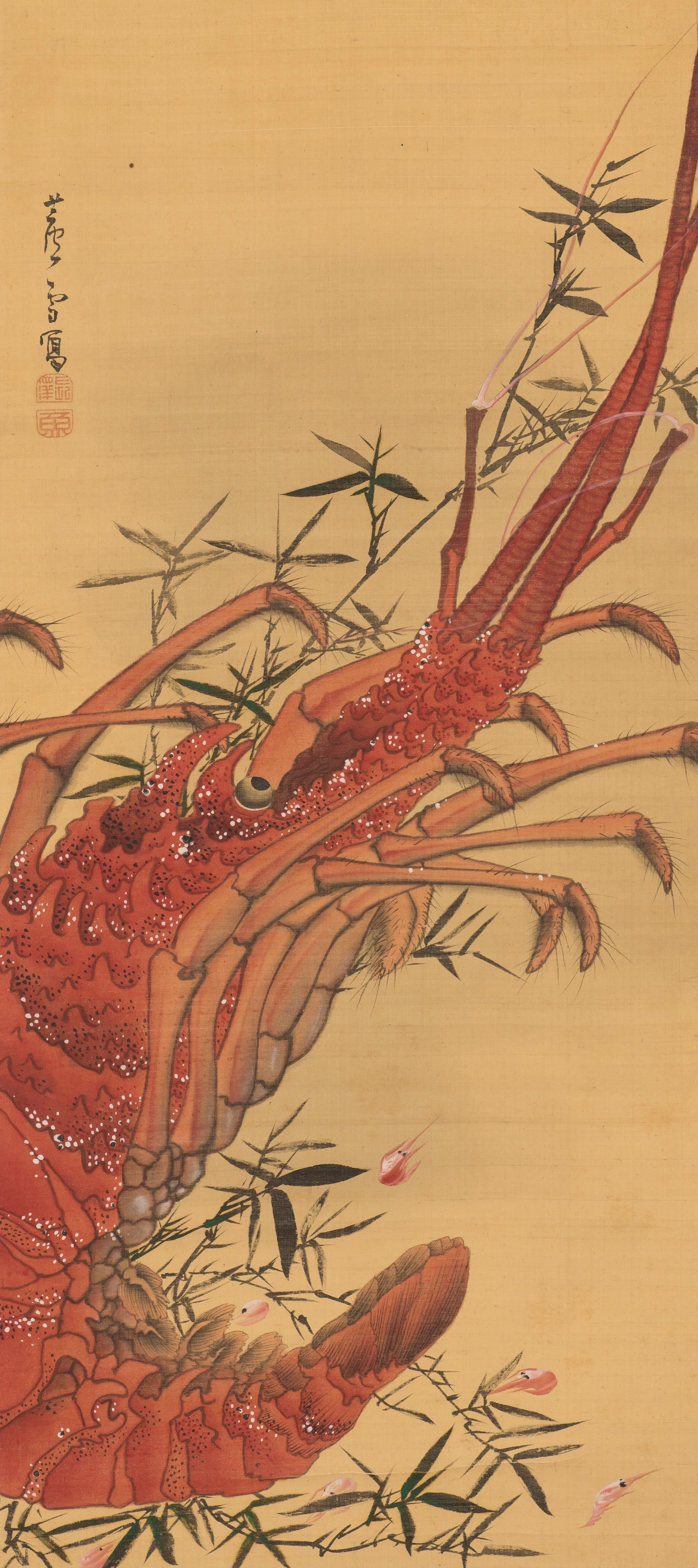
Lobster

== See also ==
- Itō Jakuchū
