= Yamaguchi Soken =

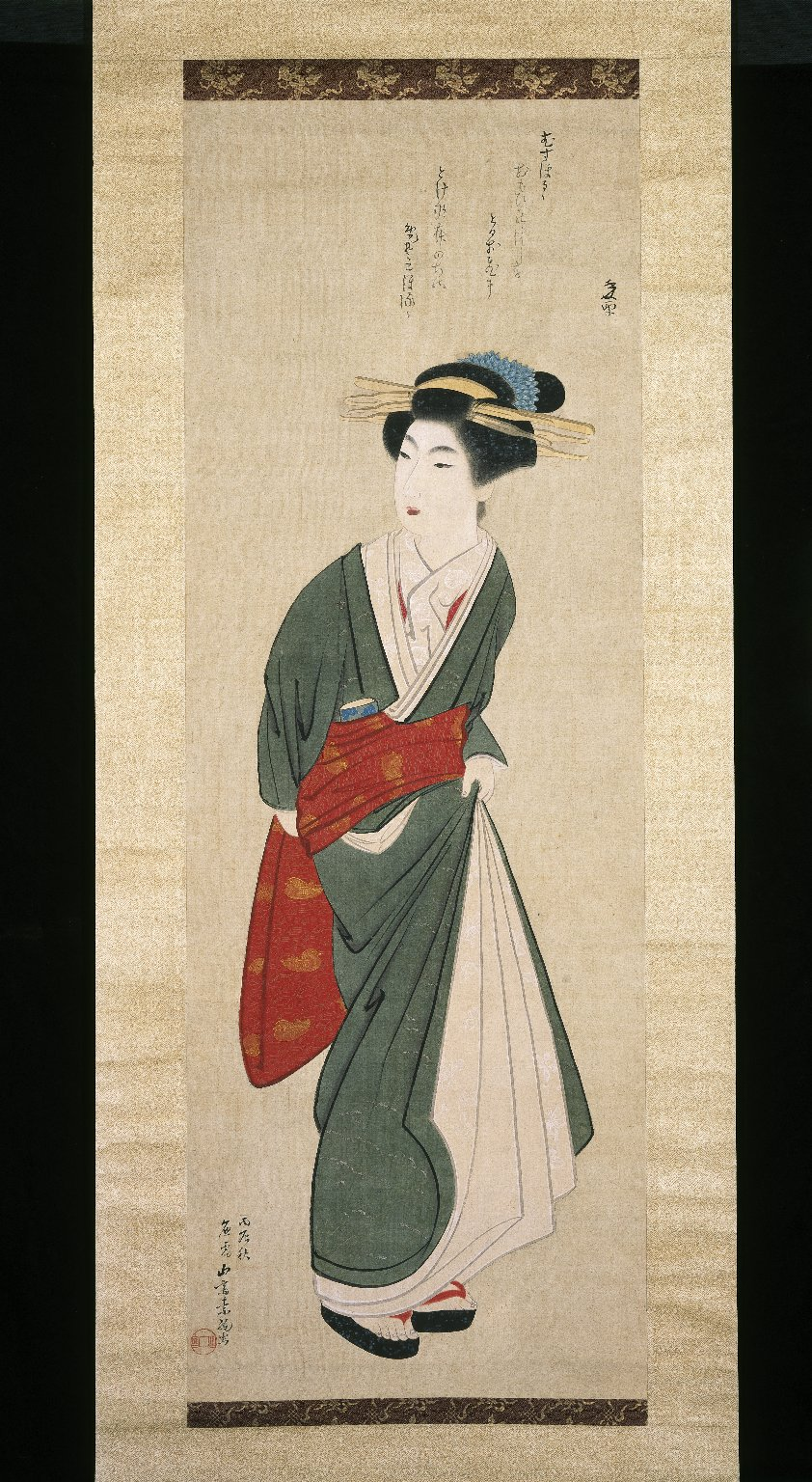
A Kyōto Geisha

Yamaguchi Soken, also called Takejirō (Japanese:山口 素絢; 1759, Kyōto - 22 November 1818, Kyōto) was a Japanese painter of the Shijō school. He was one of the "Ten Great Ones" (応門十哲; a reference to the Ten Great Disciples of Confucius), taught by Maruyama Ōkyo.

== Life and work ==
He was the son of a kimono merchant. As a result, he came to specialize in pictures of women, and his skill at painting them became proverbial. He also created landscapes, pictures of birds and flowers and what, in Western art, would be known as genre scenes. Many of these represent the life and customs of Kyoto in a light and witty way.

He also produced illustrated books; including Yamato jimbutsu gafu (大和人物画譜; roughly "Japanese Portrait Gallery", 1800) and Yamato jimbutsu gafu kōhen (大和人物画譜 後篇; roughly, "Human Figure Drawing", 1804), as well as a medical text translated from the Dutch.

Among his best known works are the fusuma (sliding door) paintings he designed together with Matsumura Keibun, entitled "Summer to Autumn; flowers and birds" (春秋花鳥図, 1813), which are currently held at the Nezu Museum. Other pieces of his work are held in the permanent collections of the British Museum, the Metropolitan Museum of Art, the University of Michigan Museum of Art, the Honolulu Museum of Art, the Brunnier Art Museum, the Brooklyn Museum, the Johnson Museum of Art, the Harvard Art Museums, the Los Angeles County Museum of Art, the Museum of Fine Arts, Boston, the Minneapolis Institute of Art, the Vanderbilt University Fine Arts Gallery Collection, and the Seattle Art Museum, among others.

He was interred at the Dannō-Hōrin-ji, a Jōdo-shū temple in Kyōto.

== Sources ==
- Tazawa, Yutaka: "Yamaguchi Soken". In: Biographical Dictionary of Japanese Art. Kodansha International, 1981, ISBN 0-87011-488-3.
- Laurance P. Roberts: "Soken". In: A Dictionary of Japanese Artists. Weatherhill, 1976, ISBN 0-8348-0113-2.
