= Shibata Zeshin =

19th century Japanese painter

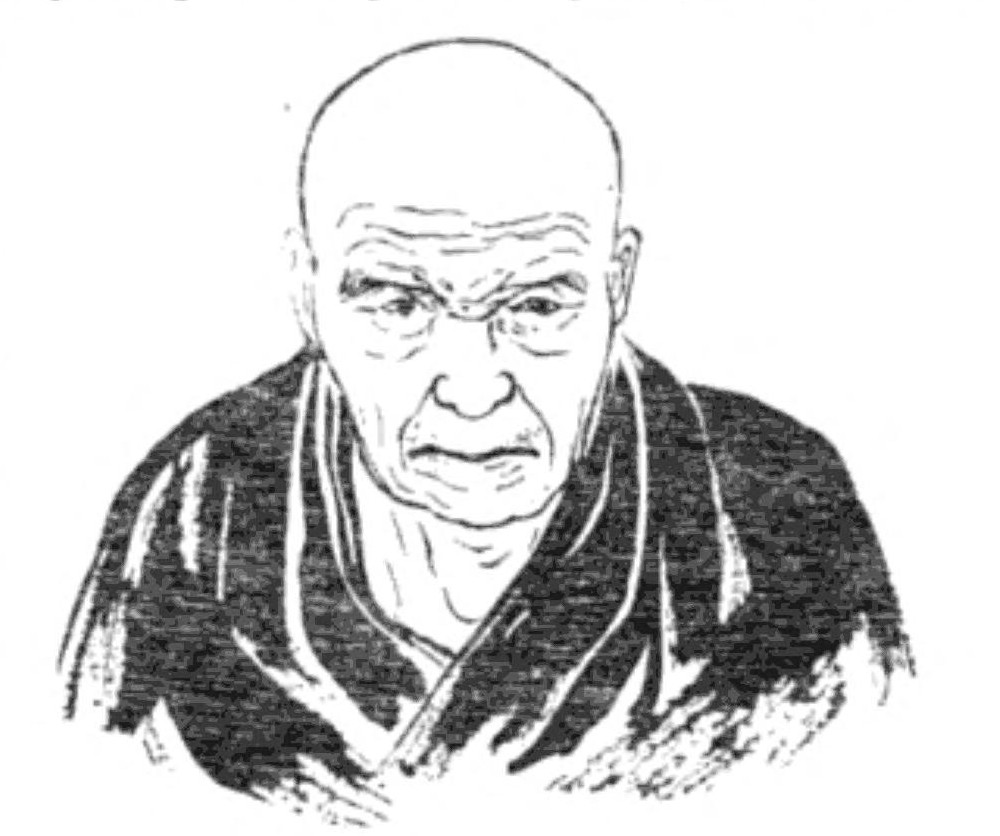
- Posthumous portrait published in Kokumin no Tomo, 1897
- Born: Shibata Zeshin; 15 March 1807
- Died: 13 July 1891 (aged 84)

Shibata Zeshin (柴田 是真; March 15, 1807 – July 13, 1891) was a Japanese lacquer painter and print artist of the late Edo period and early Meiji era. He has been called "Japan's greatest lacquerer", but his reputation as painter and print artist is more complex: In Japan, he is known as both too modern, a panderer to the Westernization movement, and also an overly conservative traditionalist who did nothing to stand out from his contemporaries. Despite holding this complicated reputation in Japan, Zeshin has come to be well regarded and much studied among the art world of the West, in Britain and the United States in particular.

== Biography ==
Zeshin was born and raised in Edo (modern-day Tokyo). His grandfather Izumi Chobei and his father Ichigoro were shrine carpenters (miyadaiku) and skilled wood carvers. His father, who had taken his wife's family name of Shibata, was also an experienced ukiyo-e painter, having studied under Katsukawa Shunshō. This, of course, gave him an excellent start on the road to being an artist and craftsman. At age eleven, Kametaro, as Zeshin was called in his childhood, became apprenticed to a lacquerer named Koma Kansai II.

At age 13, the young man who would become Zeshin abandoned the name Kametaro and became Junzo. Koma Kansai decided that his young charge would need to learn to sketch, paint, and create original designs in order to become a great lacquerer. He arranged for young Shibata to study under Suzuki Nanrei, a great painter of the Shijō school. Shibata then took on yet another artist's name, abandoning Junzo and signing his works "Reisai," using the Rei from Suzuki Nanrei, and the sai from Koma Kansai.

It was during his time with Nanrei that he was given the name Zeshin, which he would stick with for the rest of his life. The name has a meaning similar to "this is true" or "the Truth", a reference to an old Chinese tale of a king who held an audience with a great number of painters. While nearly all of the painters afforded the king the proper respect, bowing before him and comporting themselves appropriately, one arrived half-naked, did not bow, and sat on the floor licking his paintbrush; the king exclaimed "now, this is a true artist!" From this the name Zeshin was taken.

Zeshin learned not only the basics of painting and sketching, but also Japanese tea ceremony, haiku and waka poetry, history, literature and philosophy. This would form the foundation of his training in not only the techniques of the traditional arts, but also, and perhaps more importantly, the aesthetic and philosophy of Japanese traditional art. Many of his works from the period of his studies with Nanrei were fan paintings. The great ukiyo-e artist Utagawa Kuniyoshi was impressed with these fan paintings and, approaching the young painter, began a friendship which would last for many years.

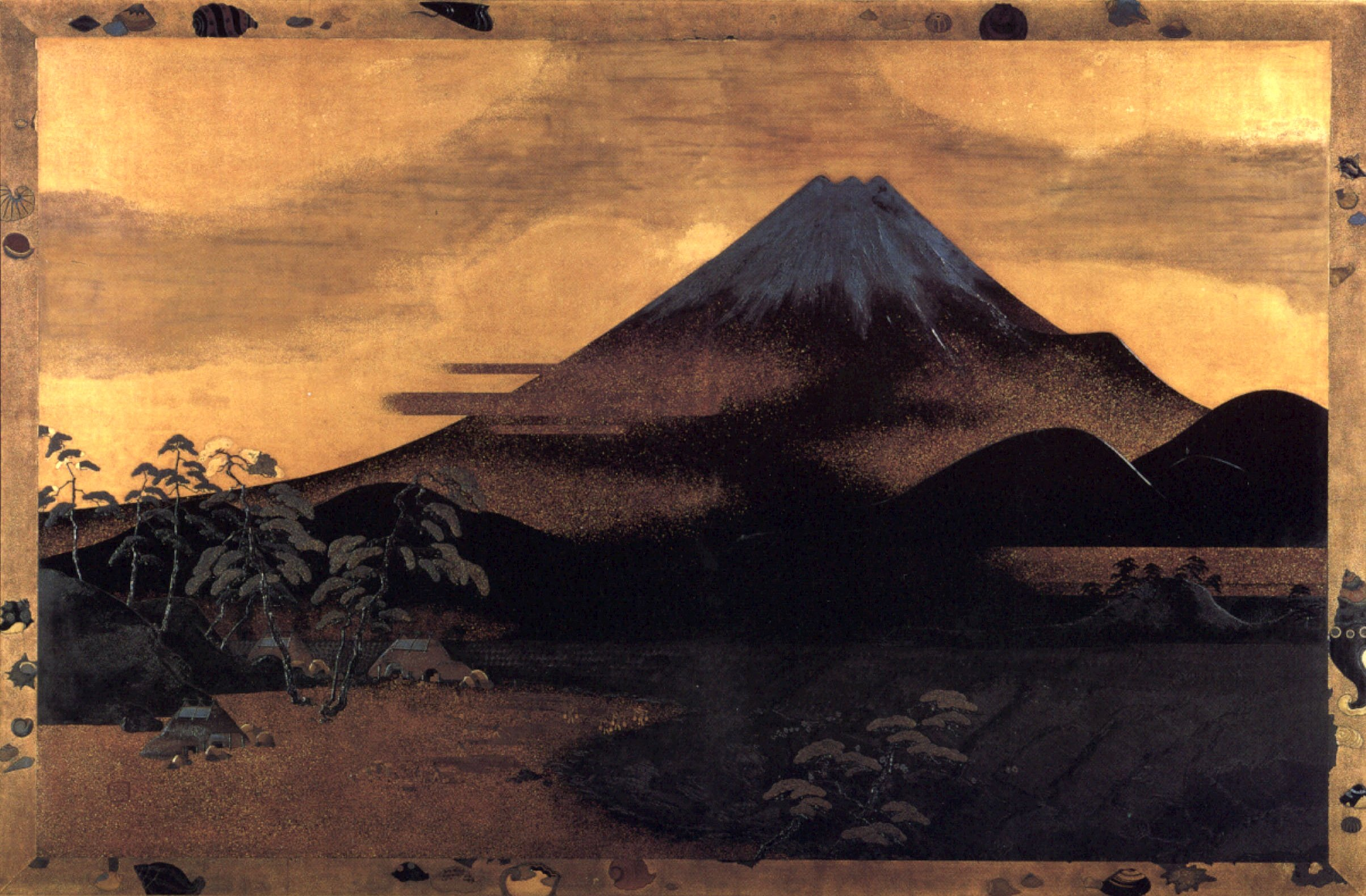
Maki-e Fuji Tagonoura, 1872

Zeshin later studied under other great artists of the Kyoto school, including Maruyama Ōkyo, Okamoto Toyohiko, and Goshin. Though he would later be known primarily for his work with lacquers, Zeshin excelled at traditional ink painting, and produced many works of traditional subjects such as tigers and waterfalls. Though Japanese masters (sensei) are often quite egotistical and arrogant before their students, one of Zeshin's teachers is reputed to have made the comment that "just as you cannot appreciate the size of Mt. Fuji while standing upon it, so you cannot truly appreciate my skill and reputation while in Kyoto; when you return to Edo you will realize my incredible import and your great fortune in having studied under me." Zeshin, on the other hand, is reputed to have told his own students that he did not wish them to be known as "a pupil of Zeshin's, but rather as a great artist who studied under a man called Zeshin."

Koma Kansai died in 1835, and Zeshin inherited the Koma School workshop. He took on a young man by the name of Ikeda Taishin as a pupil; Taishin would remain his pupil and close friend until his death in 1903. Zeshin married in 1849 and named his first son Reisai, but lost his mother and his wife both soon afterwards.

In the 1830s and 1840s, Japan suffered an economic crisis, and artists were strictly limited, by law, in their use of silver and gold, both nearly essential for traditional styles of lacquer decoration. Zeshin compensated by using bronze to simulate the look and texture of iron, and with a variety of other substances and decorative styles to keep his work beautiful, while remaining traditional and doable. Many of his pieces could be said to embrace the concept of wabi, that is, beauty and elegance in the very simple, as exemplified by the Japanese tea ceremony. Although very few of his Edo period (pre-1868) pieces survive, it is evident in many of his later pieces that he would use, at times, a very simple and nearly colorless style of decoration, while continuing to use the traditional designs such as flowers and reeds.

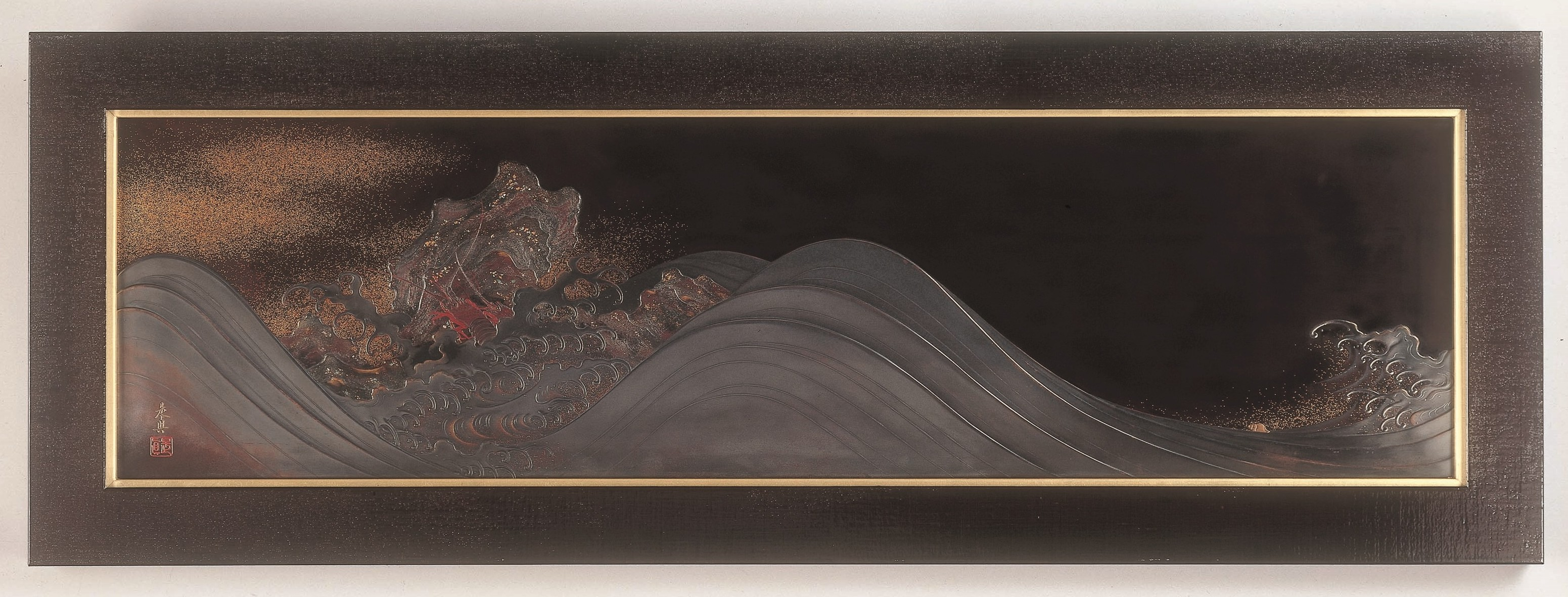
"Waves" maki-e panel, 1888-1890, the Khalili Collection of Japanese Art

Beginning in 1869, Zeshin was commissioned to work for the Imperial government, and created many works of art for them which are no longer extant. These included a set of gold-lacquered chairs for the Imperial Palace decorated in a sakura (cherry blossom) motif. He was later made Japan's official representative to several international expositions, including Vienna in 1873, Philadelphia the following year, and Paris, although he did not personally attend any of these. One year before his death in 1891, Zeshin was granted the immense honor of membership in the newly created Imperial Art Committee and is today the only artist who has been recognized in 2 fields (painting and maki-e) of work. The honor of Imperial Commissioned Artists was only granted to 53 artists between 1890 and 1944.

Today, one of the greatest collections of Zeshin's works is the Khalili Collections of London, containing over 100 works by the artist.

== Style ==
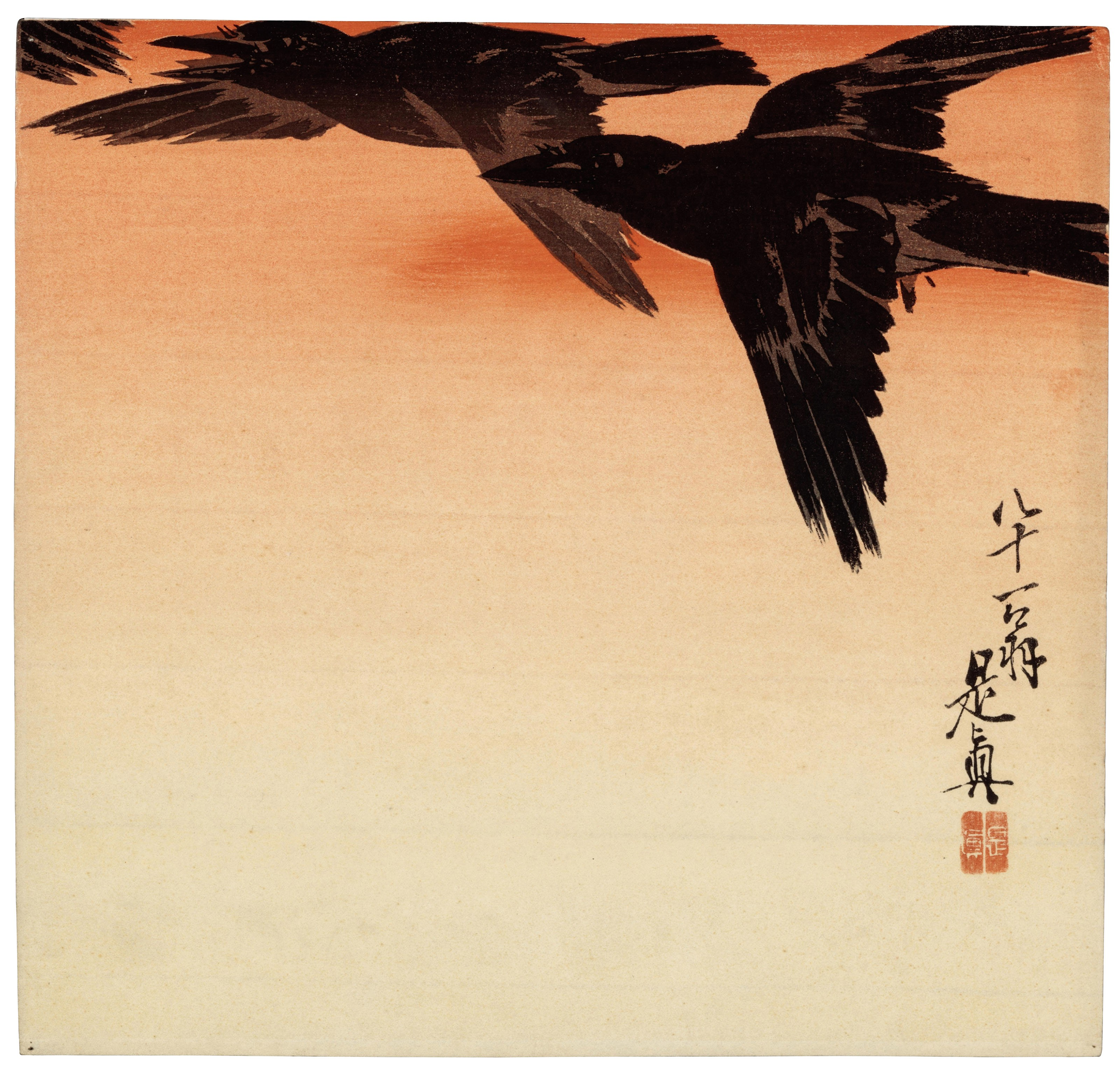
Crows Fly by Red Sky at Sunset, woodblock print, ca. 1880 (Brooklyn Museum)

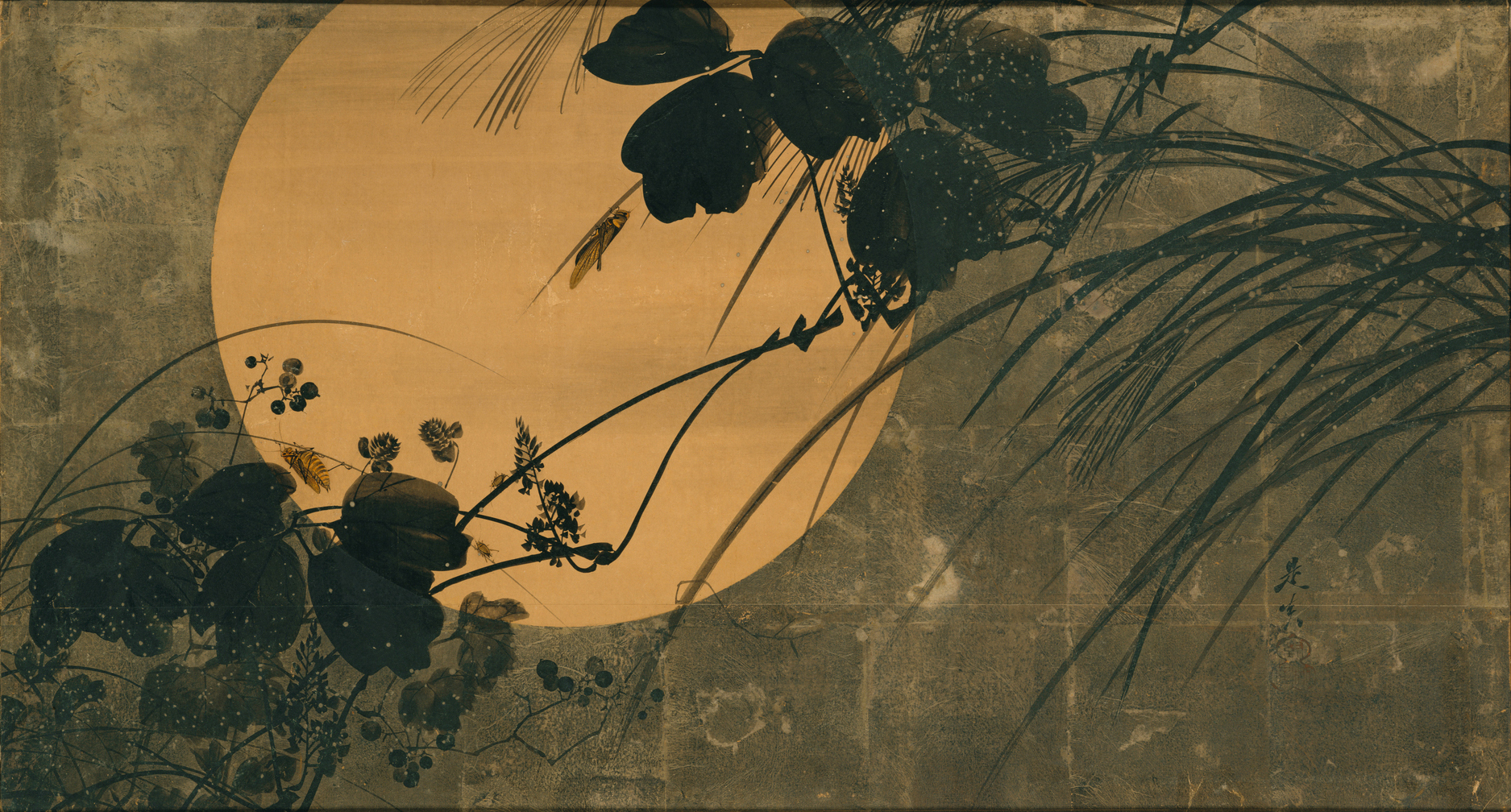
Autumn Grasses in Moonlight, ink, lacquer, and silver leaf on paper, 1872–91 (Metropolitan Museum of Art)

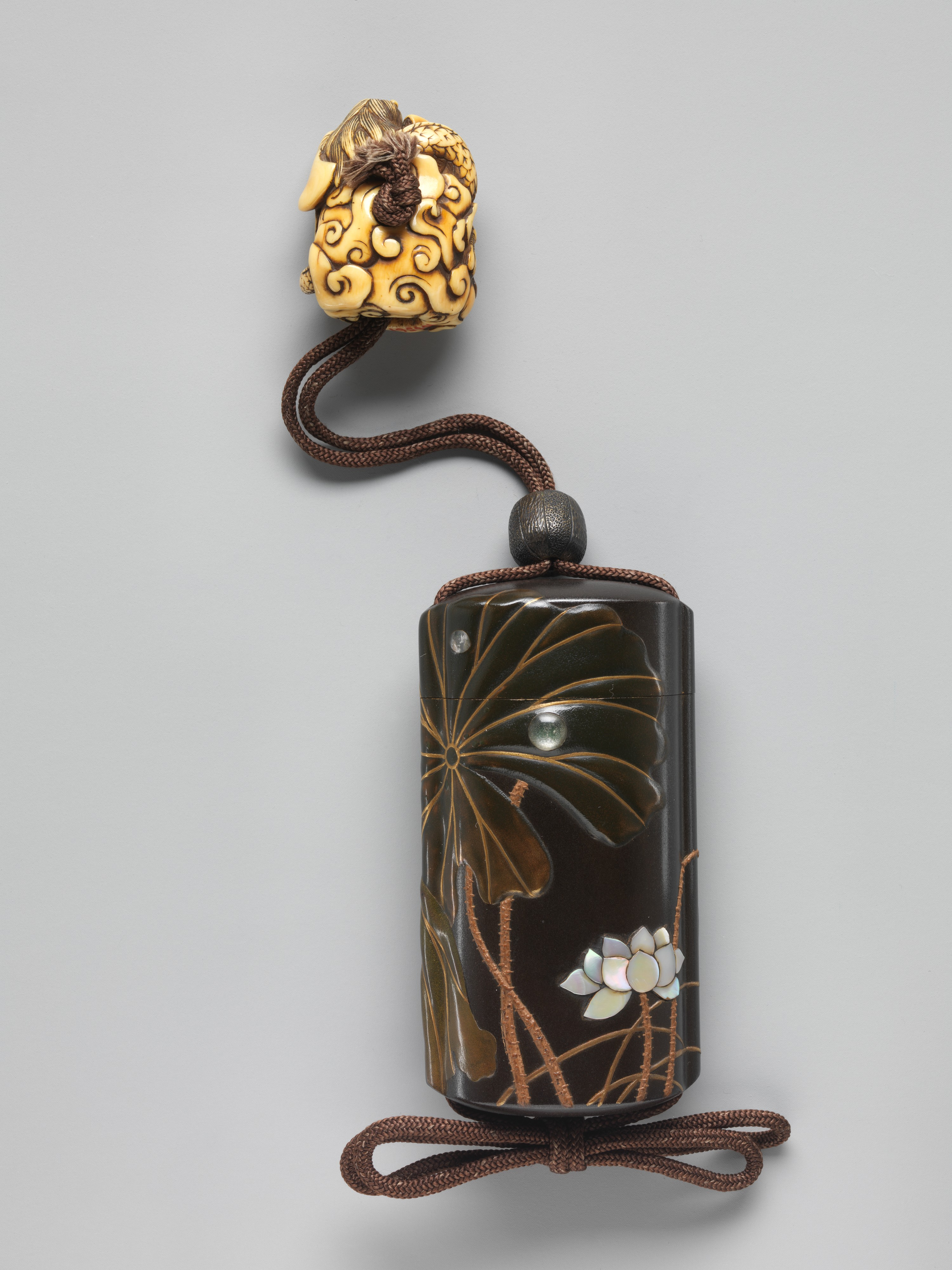
Inrō with design of lotus, made of wood, lacquer, shell and glass, with silk cord, late Edo-early Meiji period (Metropolitan Museum of Art)

Zeshin experimented with the technical aspects of lacquer. He mixed his lacquers with a variety of substances to achieve different colors and textures, and to control the consistency and flexibility. He invented a method of painting with lacquer sap directly on paper sized with dōsa (a solution of alum and animal glue), to prevent flaking when his urushi-e scroll paintings were rolled up. He used bronze in his lacquer to simulate the appearance and texture of iron, and cereal starch to thicken his lacquer to simulate, at least in some respects, the effect of Western oil painting.

Zeshin remains, in fact, the only artist to be successful in the medium of urushi-e, as it requires specially treated paper, and a very particular consistency of lacquer to be used as paint. Zeshin also revived a complex lacquer technique called seikai-ha to produce wave forms by drawing a comb through the rapidly solidifying lacquer; this technique is so difficult it had not been used for over a century.

However, although he used many revolutionary elements in his work, both technically and creatively, Zeshin's works were always, on the whole, very traditional. In the brand-new medium of lacquer painting, he would paint traditional subjects like birds and flowers, insects, waterfalls and dragons. He copied a famous painting of a tiger by his teacher Maruyama Okyo, in lacquer. A red, black and gold lacquer picnic set by Zeshin serves as another good example of this revolutionary traditionalism. The picnic set is made in very traditional style, almost entirely of red and black lacquer with gold decorations of leaves and branches. However, on the serving tray is a series of butterflies and dragonflies, inlaid into the surface of the serving tray and carved out of iridescent seashell.

Zeshin's signature was always quite subdued, and on occasion he would be playful with the idea of the signature. There is a decorative tsuba (sword handguard) made by him on which an ant, displayed in relief in lacquer, is carrying away the "shin" character (真) of Zeshin's signature to the other side of the piece.

It has been said that much of Zeshin's work strongly represents the aesthetic concept of iki (粋), which might be translated as "chic." The Edo concept of iki, known as sui in Kansai, was described most authoritatively by Kuki Shūzō, but like the English ideas of chic, cool, and stylish, the precise colors, patterns, and other stylistic elements that constitute iki are nearly impossible to pin down. Nevertheless, that said, Zeshin's works are often labeled as iki, and considered to have just the right balance of tradition with the new, being beautiful but not gaudy and simple but not boring and smart but not arrogant. His style has been compared by some to haiku, in that its beauty and meaning is more powerful in what is not shown than by what is.

Along with Nakayama Komin and Shirayama Shosai, he is considered one of the three great late lacquerers of Japan.

== Exhibitions ==
Exhibitions of Zeshin's works have taken place in various institutions internationally.

- Japanese Lacquer, 1600-1900: selections from the Charles A. Greenfield collection, 4 September to 19 October, 1980, Metropolitan Museum of Art, New York
- Shibata Zeshin: Masterpieces of Japanese Lacquer from the Khalili Collection
  - Apr – Oct 1997, National Museum of Scotland, Edinburgh, UK
  - Oct – Nov 1999, Toyama Sato Art Museum, Toyama, Japan
  - Nov 2000 – Mar 2001, Roemer and Pelizaeus Museum, Hildesheim, Germany
- The Genius of Japanese Lacquer: Masterworks by Shibata Zeshin Japan Society, New York (21 March - 15 June, 2008)

== Gallery ==
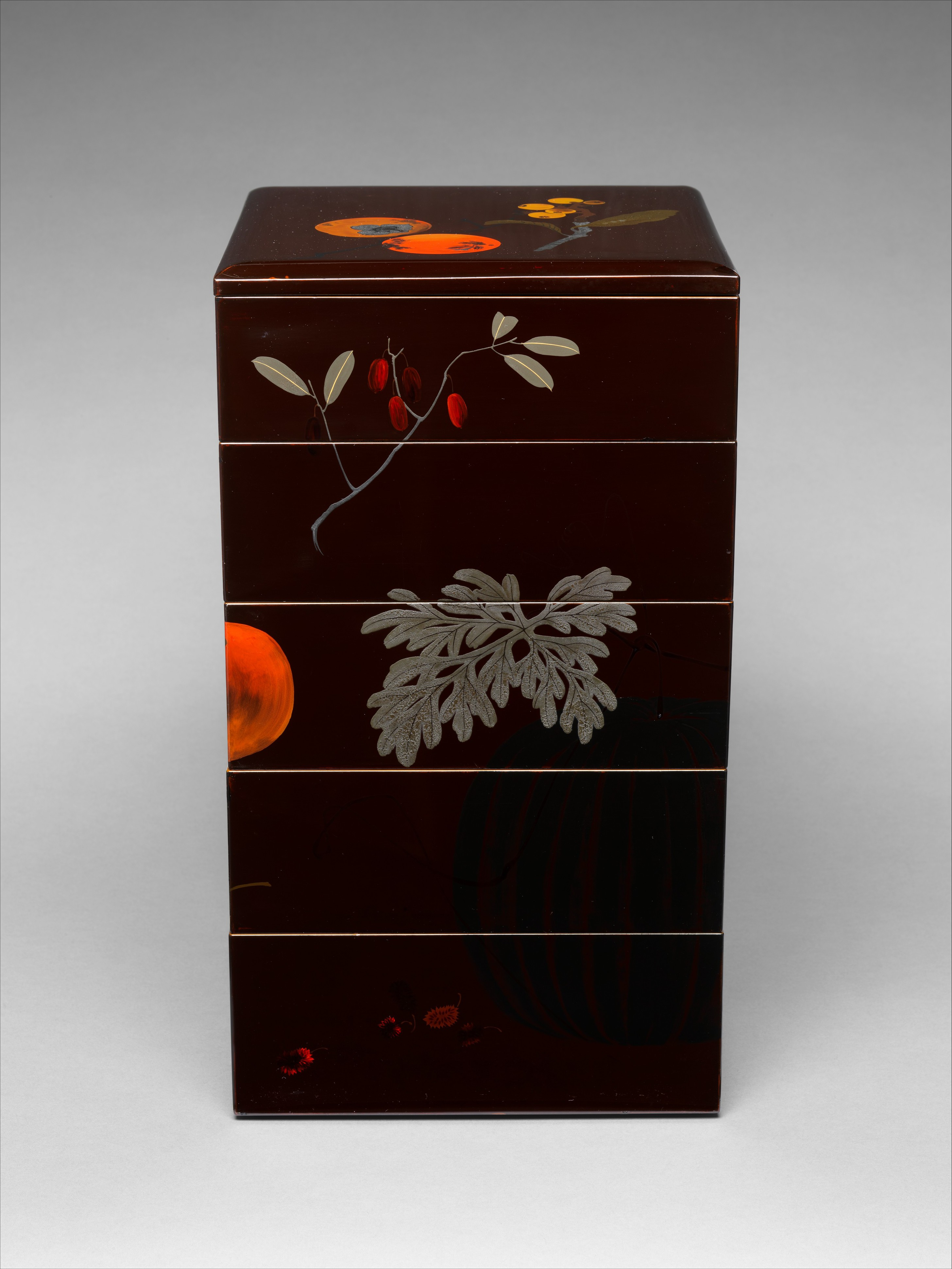
Tiered Food Box with Summer and Autumn Fruits, Metropolitan Museum of Art

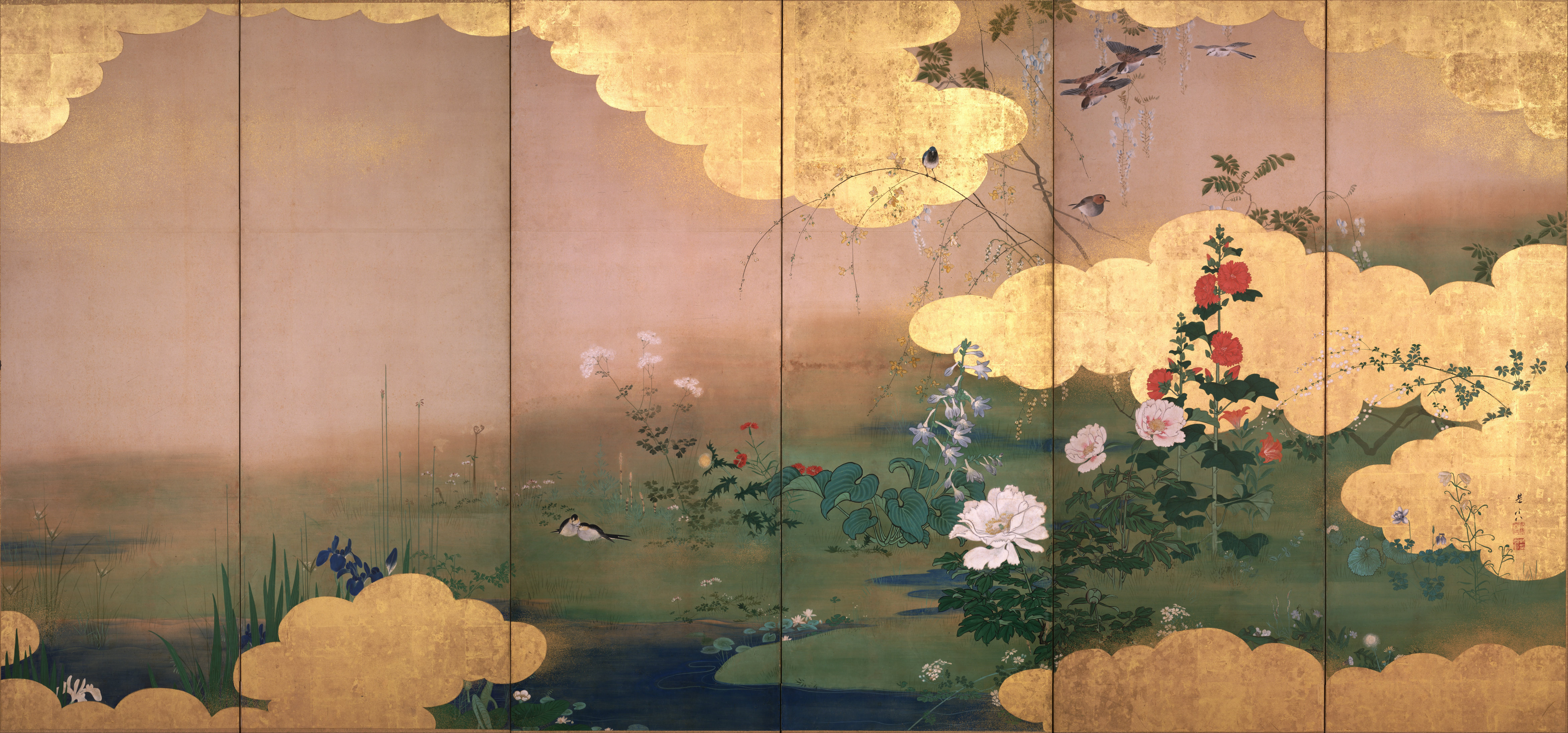
Flowers and Birds of the Four Seasons, Tokyo National Museum

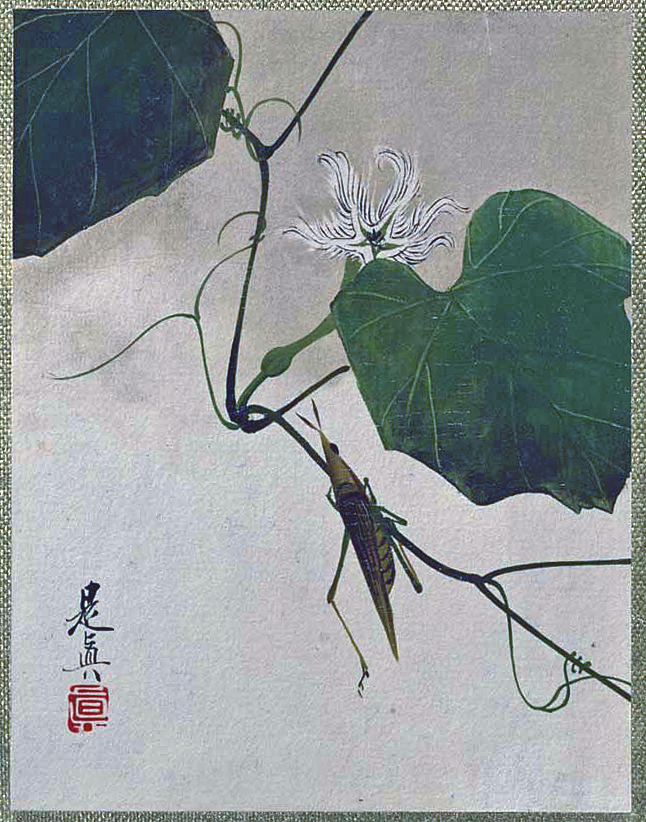
Urushi-e Gachō, Tokyo National Museum

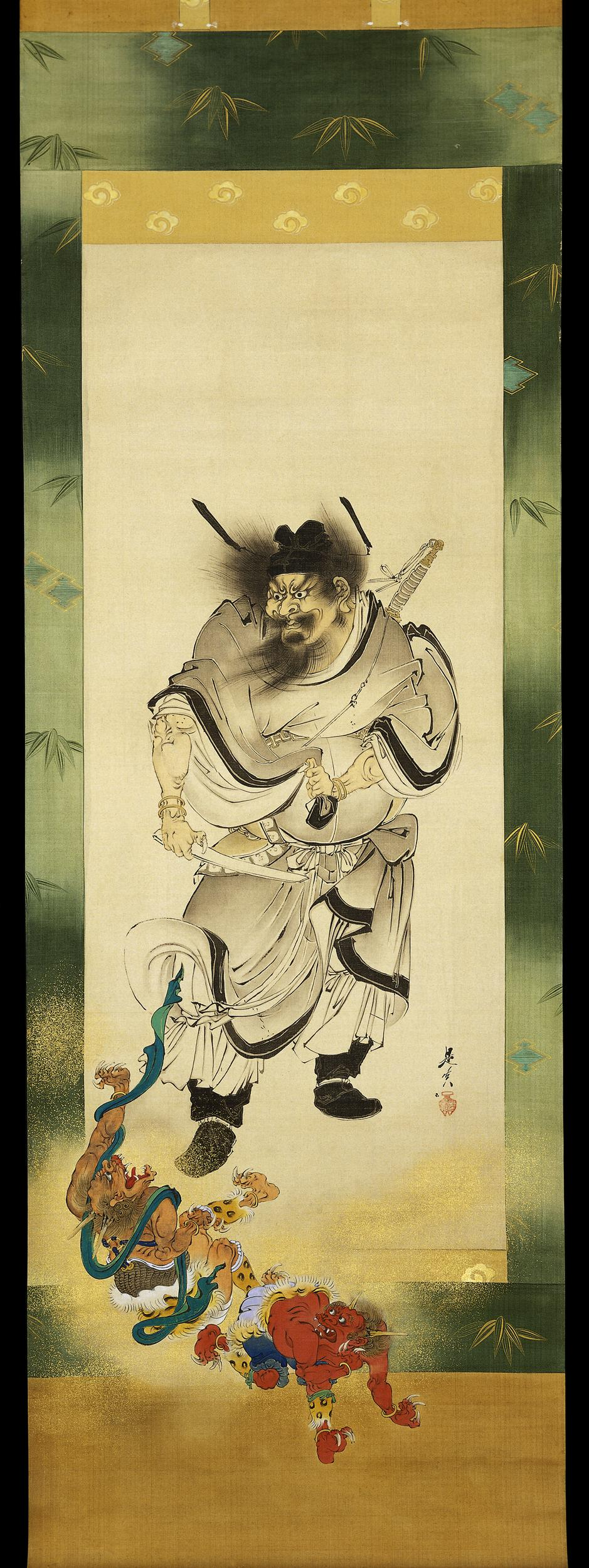
Shōki, 1865, British Museum

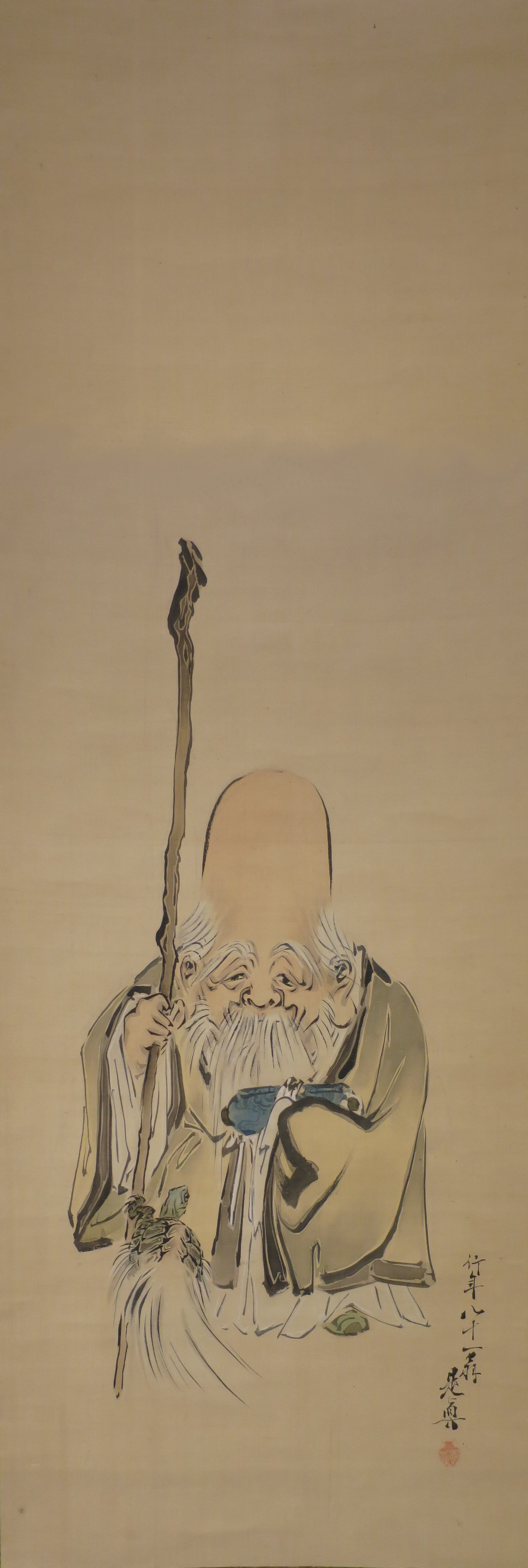
Jurōjin by Shibata Zeshin, 1887, painting, ink and color on silk (Honolulu Museum of Art)

== See also ==
- Hashimoto Gahō
- Takeuchi Seihō
