= Seika =

Form of ikebana

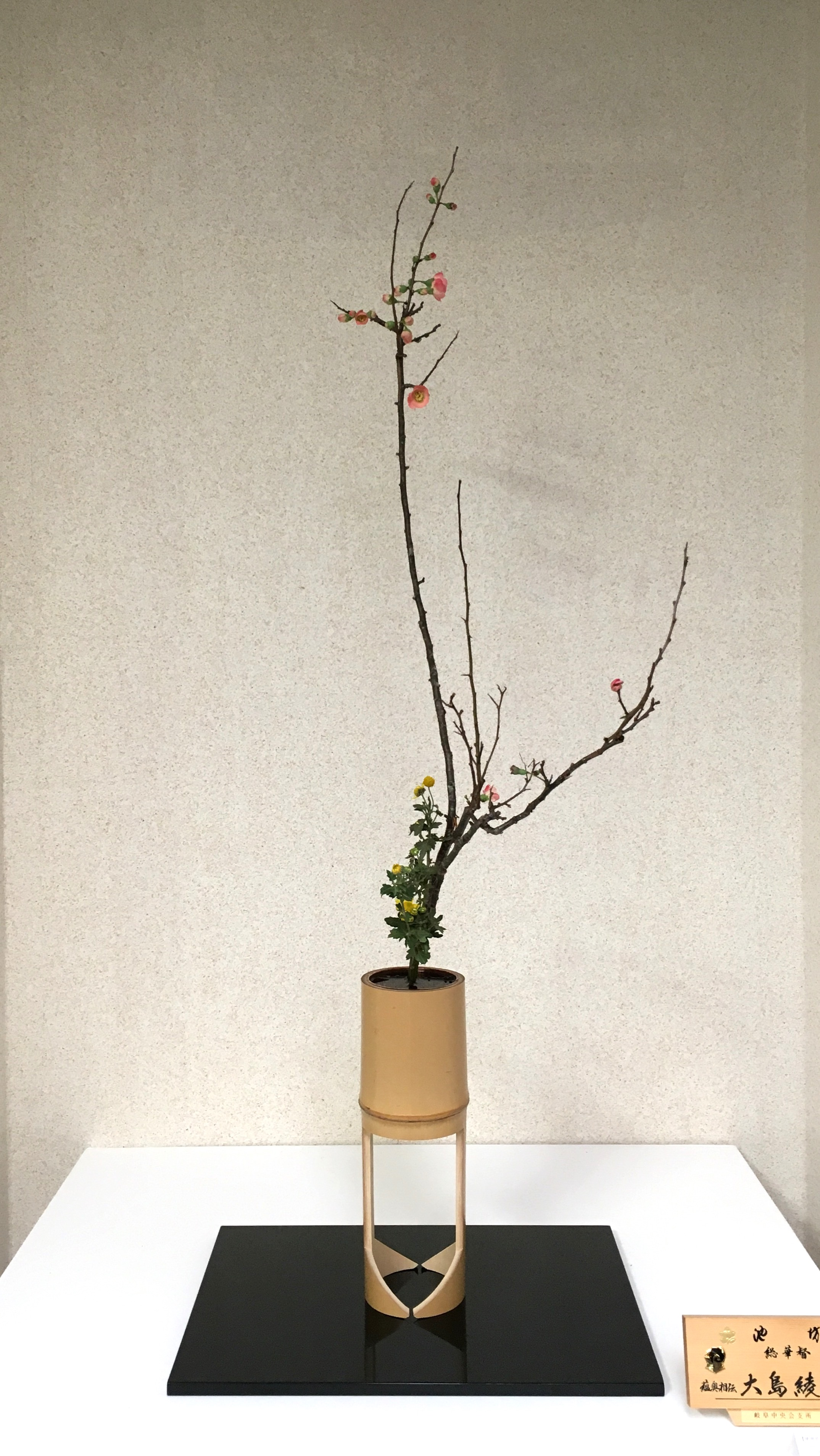
Classical shōka arrangement from the Sōka Hyakki

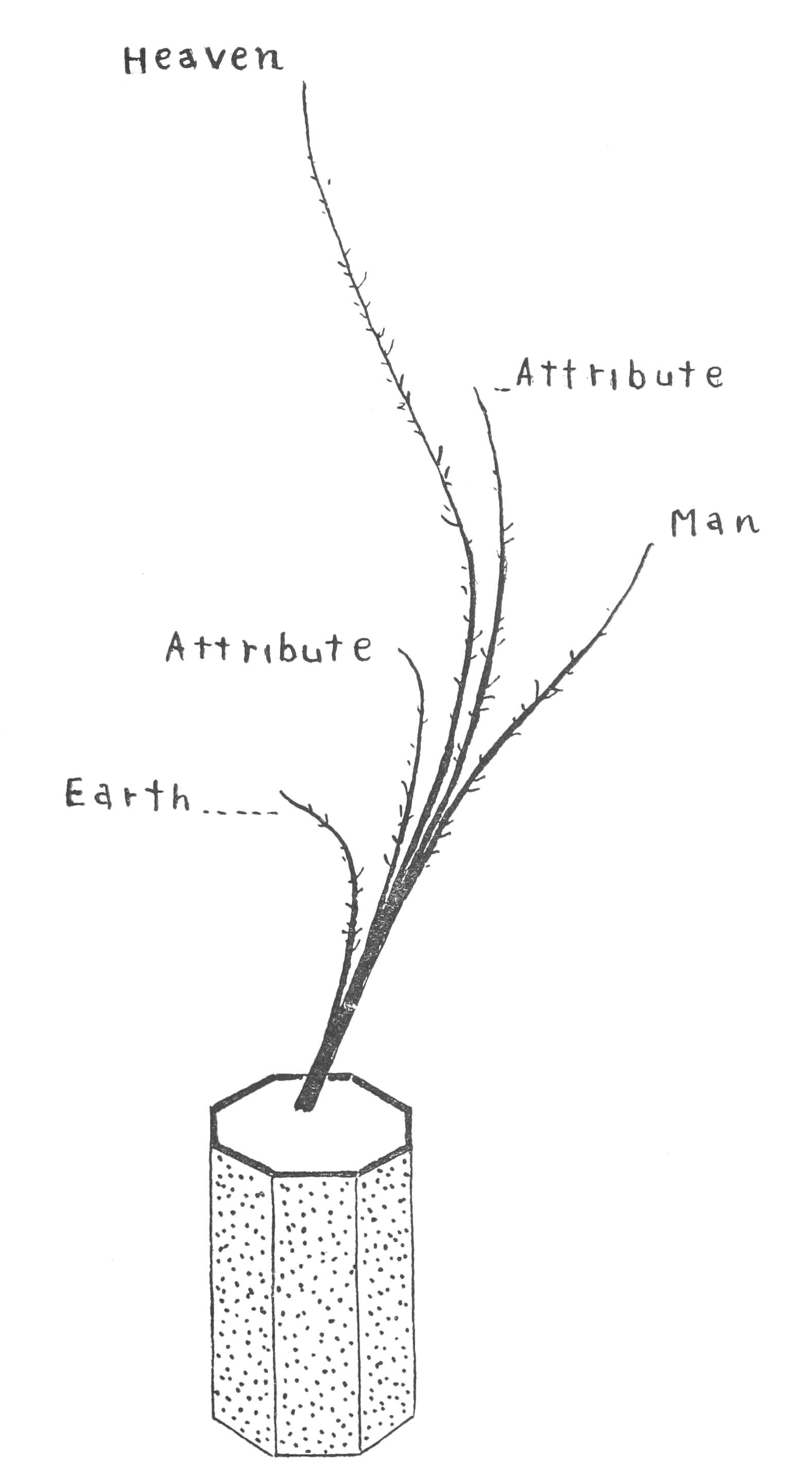
Illustration of the principal lines used in seika, which are "heaven", "human", and "earth"

Seika (生花) is a form of ikebana. Written with the same kanji characters, it is also pronounced and known as Shōka.

== History ==
The painter Sōami and the art patron and shōgun Ashikaga Yoshimasa were supporters of the style as early as the 15th century. It reached its peak of popularity and artistic development in the 18th century and was formalised in the late Edo period.

Works that were published include the Sōka Hyakki (挿花百規), a collection of 100 drawings of shōka works by the 40th headmaster Ikenobō Senjō (池坊専定). Senjō himself selected these works published in 1820. The original drawings were made by Matsumura Keibun and Yokoyama Seiki, painters of the Shijō school. The Senshō Risshōkashū (専正立生華集) is a collection of 100 drawings of rikka and shōka works by the 42nd headmaster Ikenobō Senshō (池坊専正). In the West, Japanese flower arrangement (Ike-bana) applied to Western needs is a book written by Mary Averill. It was published in 1913 and gives a description in English of seika, mostly from the Enshū-ryū school. In Japan there are currently over 1,200 officially registered different ikebana schools which all practice their own particular kind of Shoka or Seika based on the lead professional running the school.

In Ikenobō shōka, there are two styles: shōka shōfūtai with traditional form, and shōka shimputai with a more free form. Shōka shimputai was introduced by the headmaster Sen'ei Ikenobō in 1997 as a new style of shōka.

In Mishō-ryū the style is called kakubana (格花).

The Ko-ryū Toyokai school has a style of seika inherited from the Edo Period, where plants are arranged with precise angles and proportions.

== Characteristics ==
Seika incorporates many of the structural rules and classical feeling of the ancient rikka of the Ikenobō school. The concept of shusshō (出生 inner beauty) of a plant is key in the arrangement and is expressed as the living forms of plants rooted in the soil and growing upward towards the sun. It uses one to three kinds of floral materials, arranged in a single vase.

The set-up is basically triangular, with three main lines: shin, the central axis symbolising "truth"; soe the supporting branch, and tai, which are branches placed near the base to balance everything. Shin symbolises heaven (天), soe symbolises human (人), and tai the earth (地). Together these three elements (天地人 Tenchijin) represent the human universe. The number of branches should always be an uneven number. The length of each branch is also prescribed.

In some ikebana schools in Japan when performing Seika the natural characteristics of the plant have to be respected and the arrangement either done in the upright, slanted or hanging form. Also depending on where the plants would grow determines the position of it in the arrangement. So for example plants from mountain regions have to be placed above those from the lower lands. Plants used should also be seasonal to reflect the respective season in which the arrangement is being made.

In other Ikebana schools Seika is a composite that more reflects and emphasizes the design elements using plant materials. This type of Shoka was widespread in Japan in the 19th century and is less popular today.

In ancient times Aspidistra elatior leaves were often the usual tool for beginners to learn the basics of seika as they are easily handled and the side for the sun can be seen clearly. It was not uncommon in the 19th and early 20th century for Ikebana students practicing Seika or Shoka to construct Aspidistra arrangements for a year or more before graduating and being granted a license to arrange other floral materials.

== Images ==
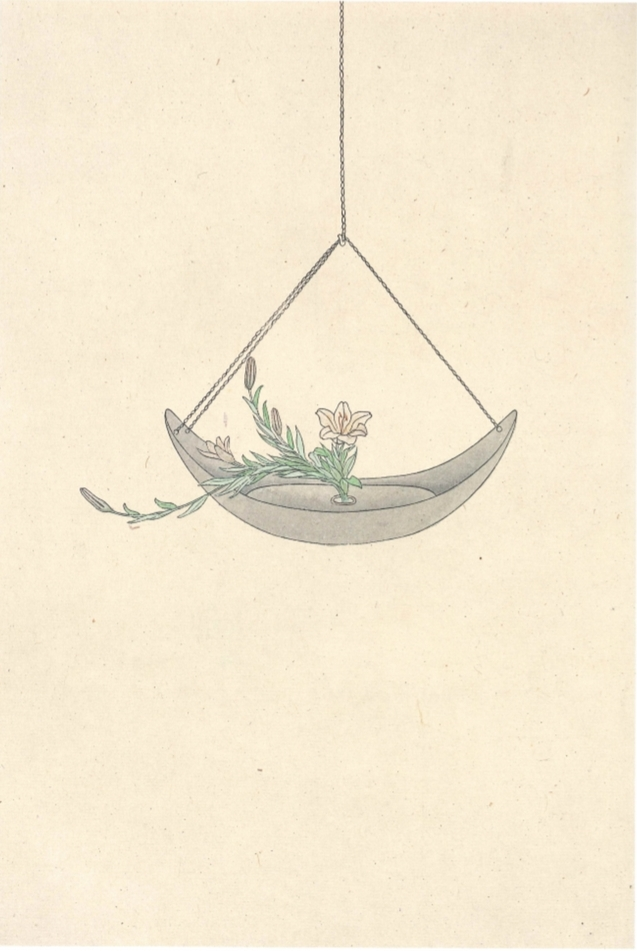
Coloured diagram of a hanging shōka, by the 40th headmaster Ikenobō Senjō, from the Sōka Hyakki (1820)

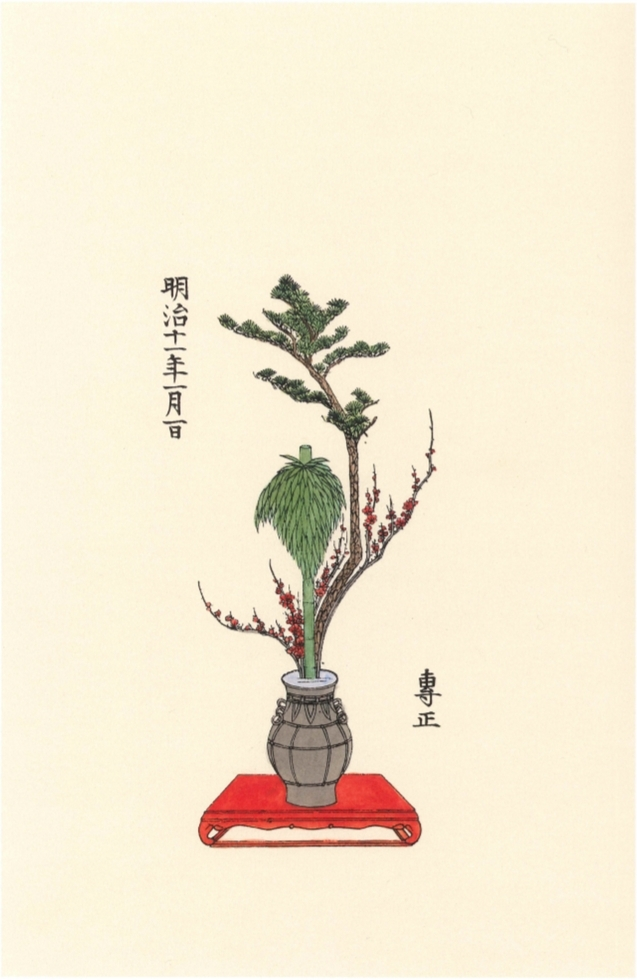
Coloured diagram of a festive shōka with the Three Friends of Winter, by the 42nd headmaster Ikenobō Senshō, from the Senshō Risshokashu (1878)

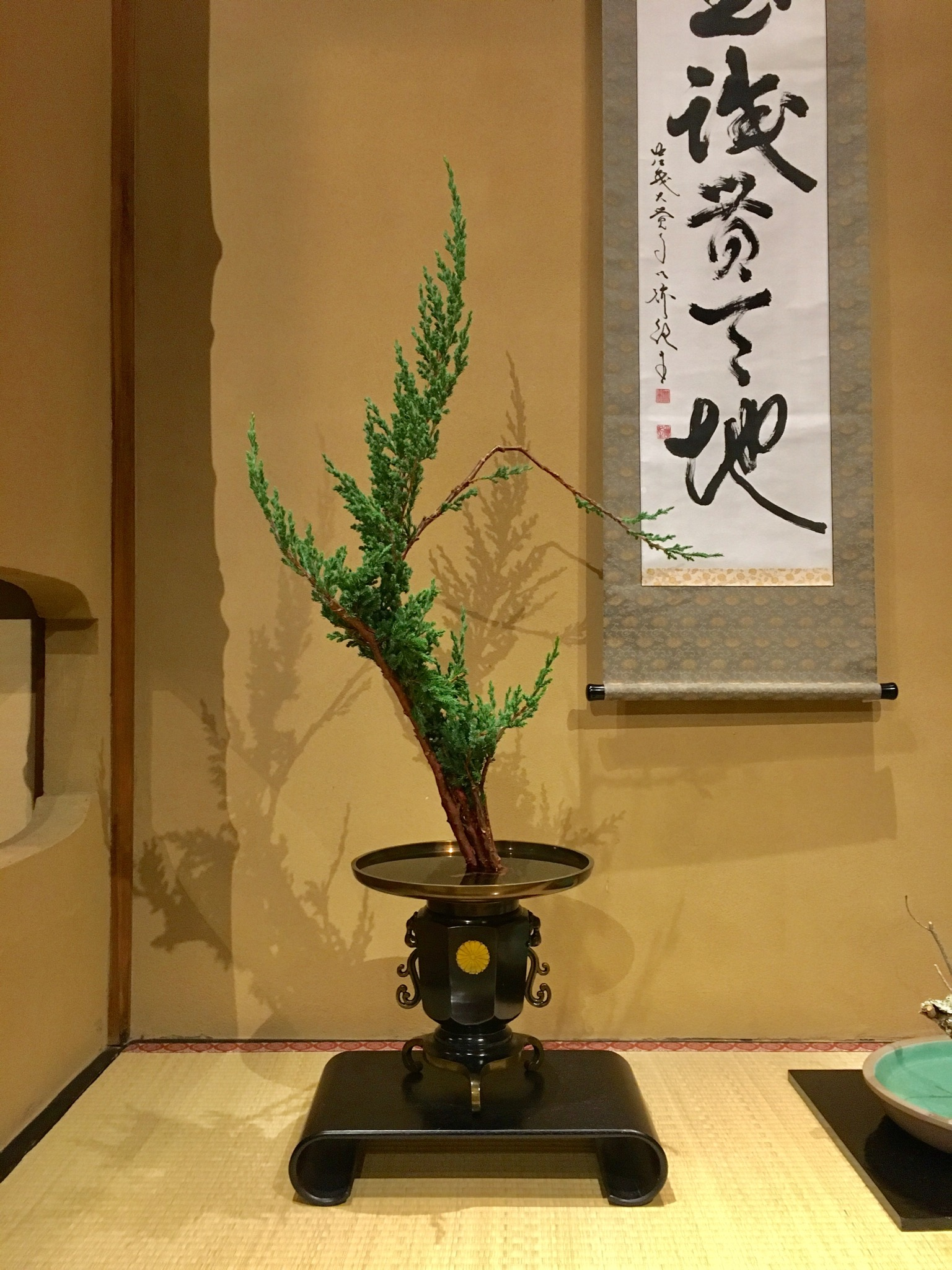
Arrangement of the Saga Go-ryū in front of a hanging scroll in a tokonoma. The branch to the right shows the silhouette of Mount Fuji

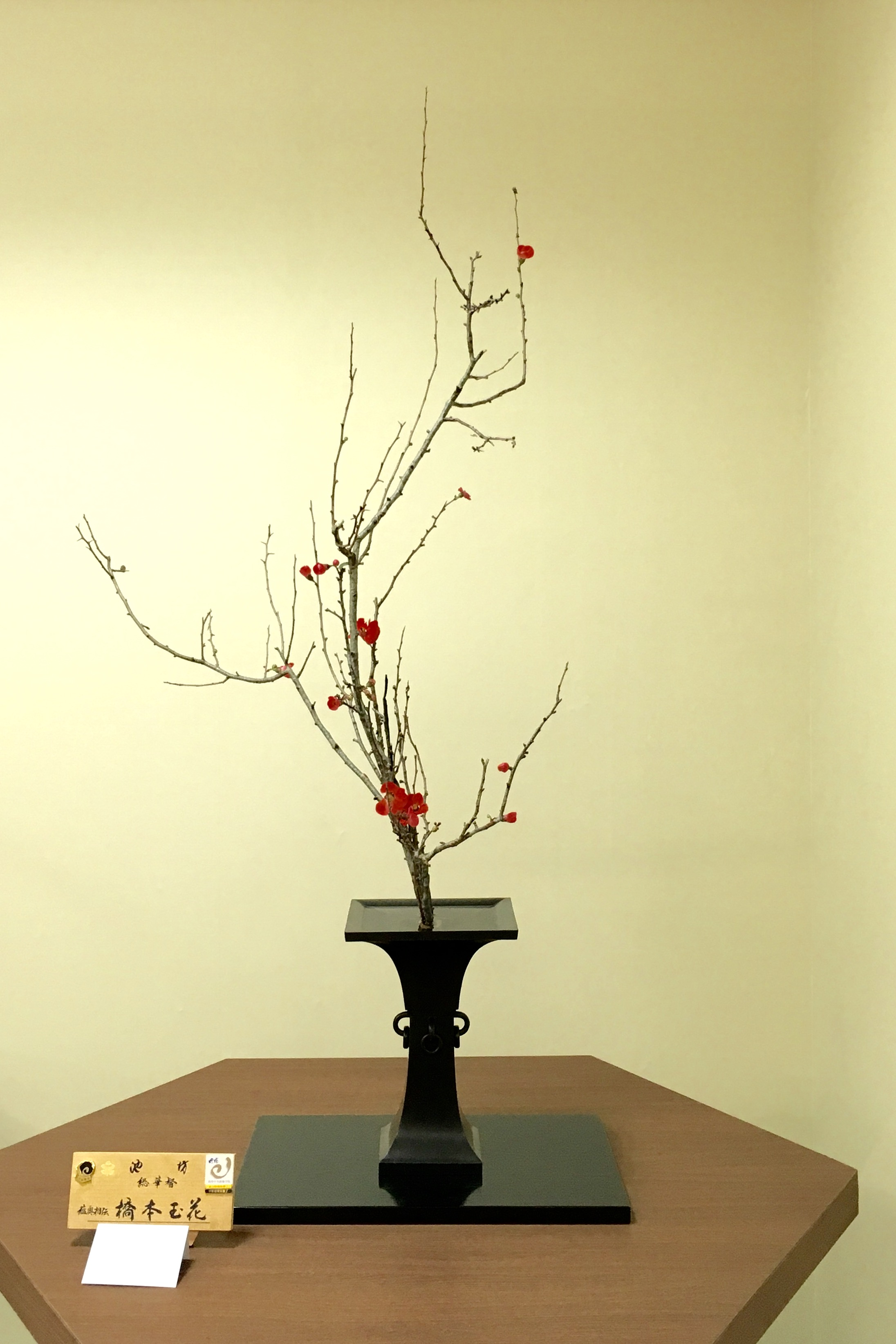
Formal shōka from the Ikenobō using a bronze vessel

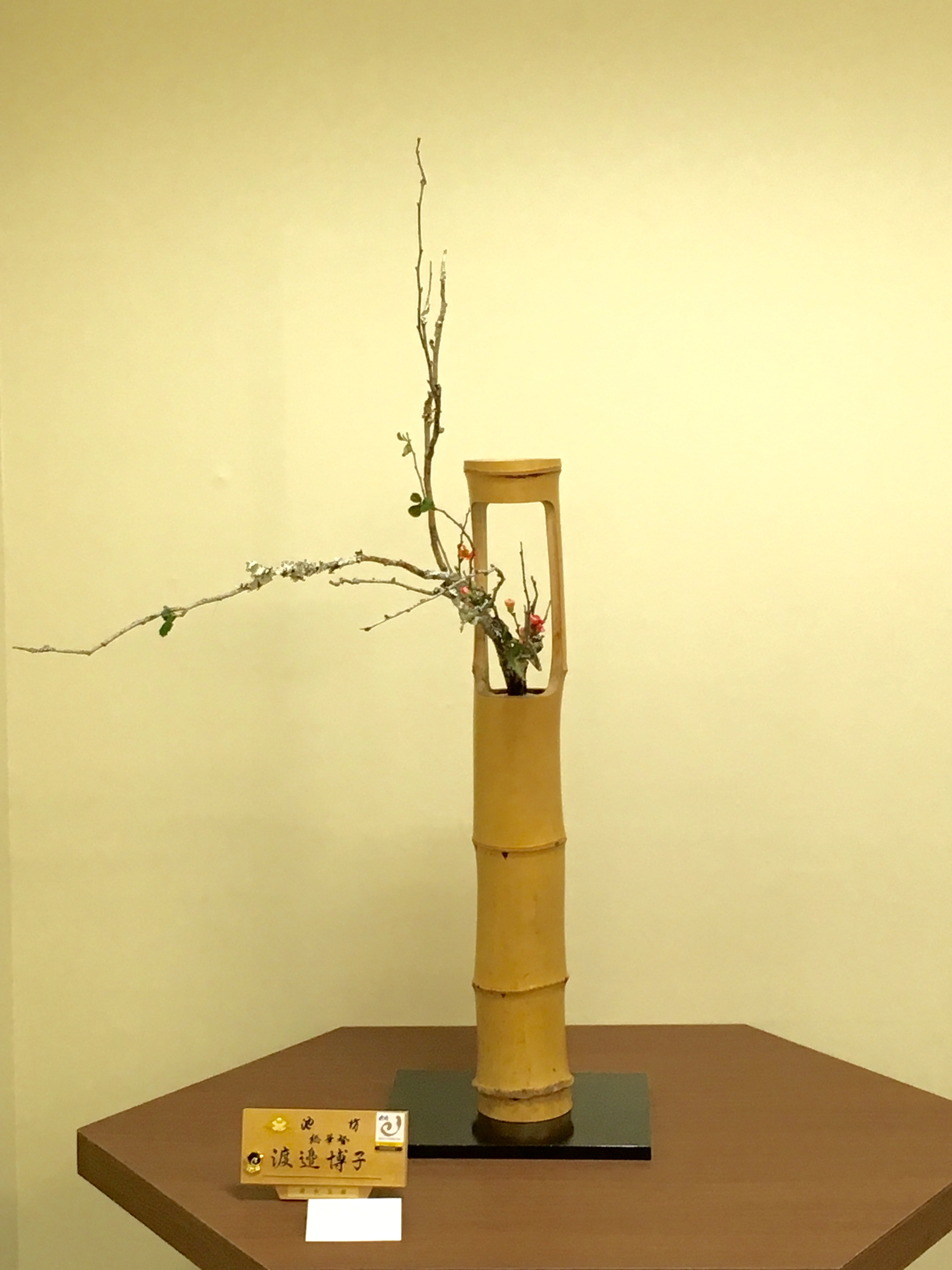
Shōka from the Ikenobō using a bamboo vessel

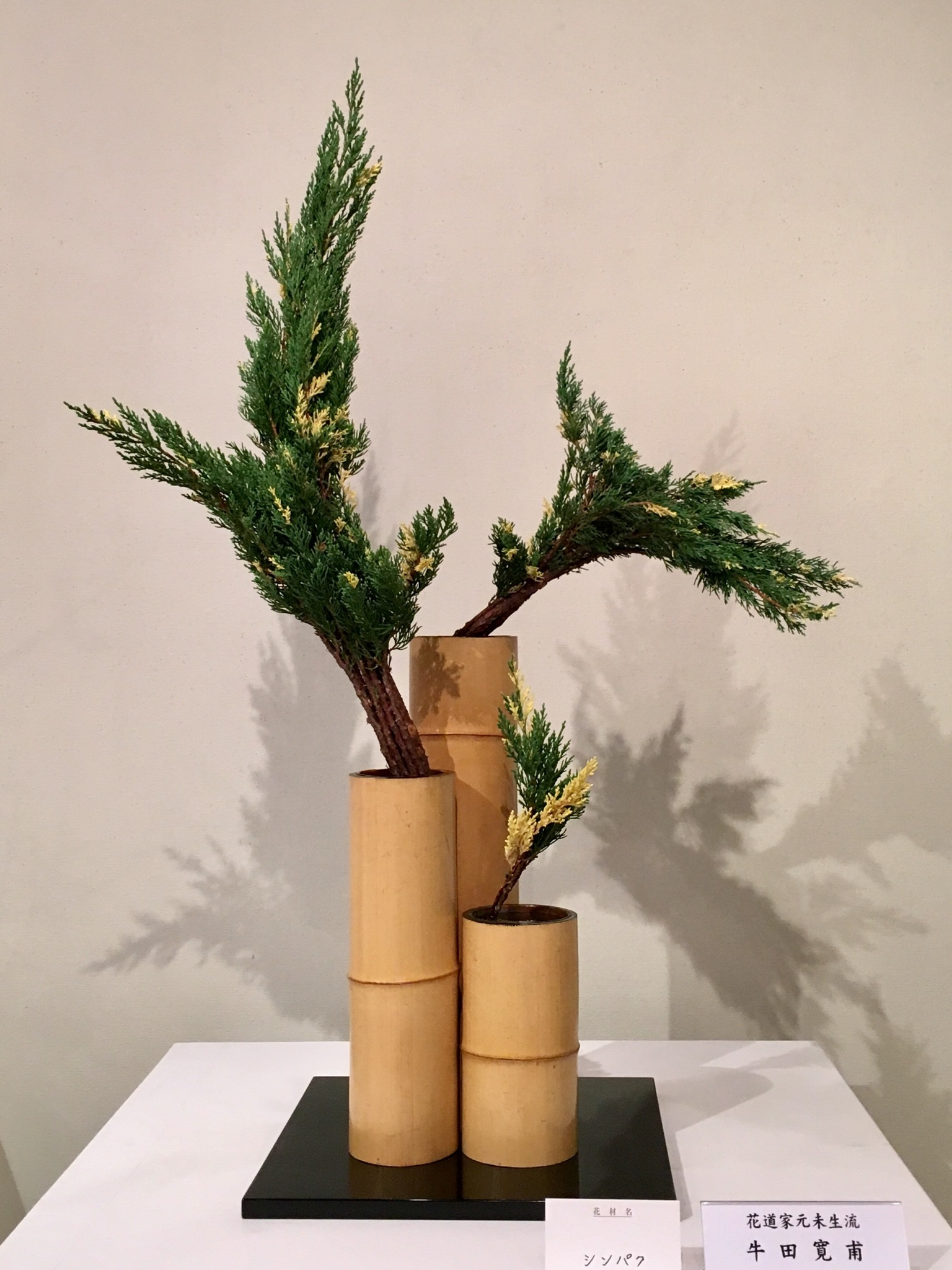
Kakubana arrangement from Hanamichi Iemoto Mishō-ryū (花道家元未生流) using three bamboo vessels

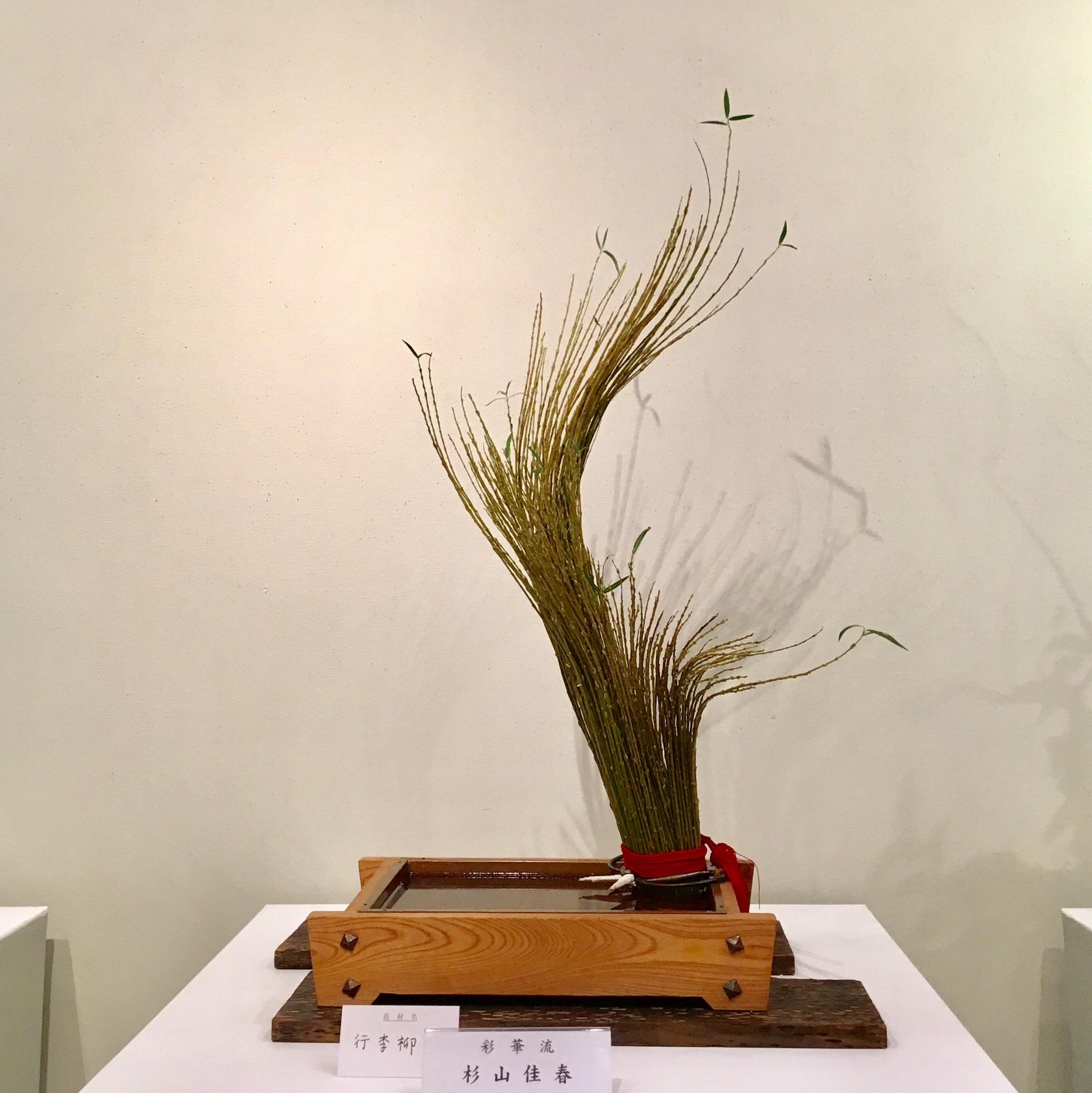
Classical arrangement from the Saika-ryū (彩華流) with Salix koriyanagi willow

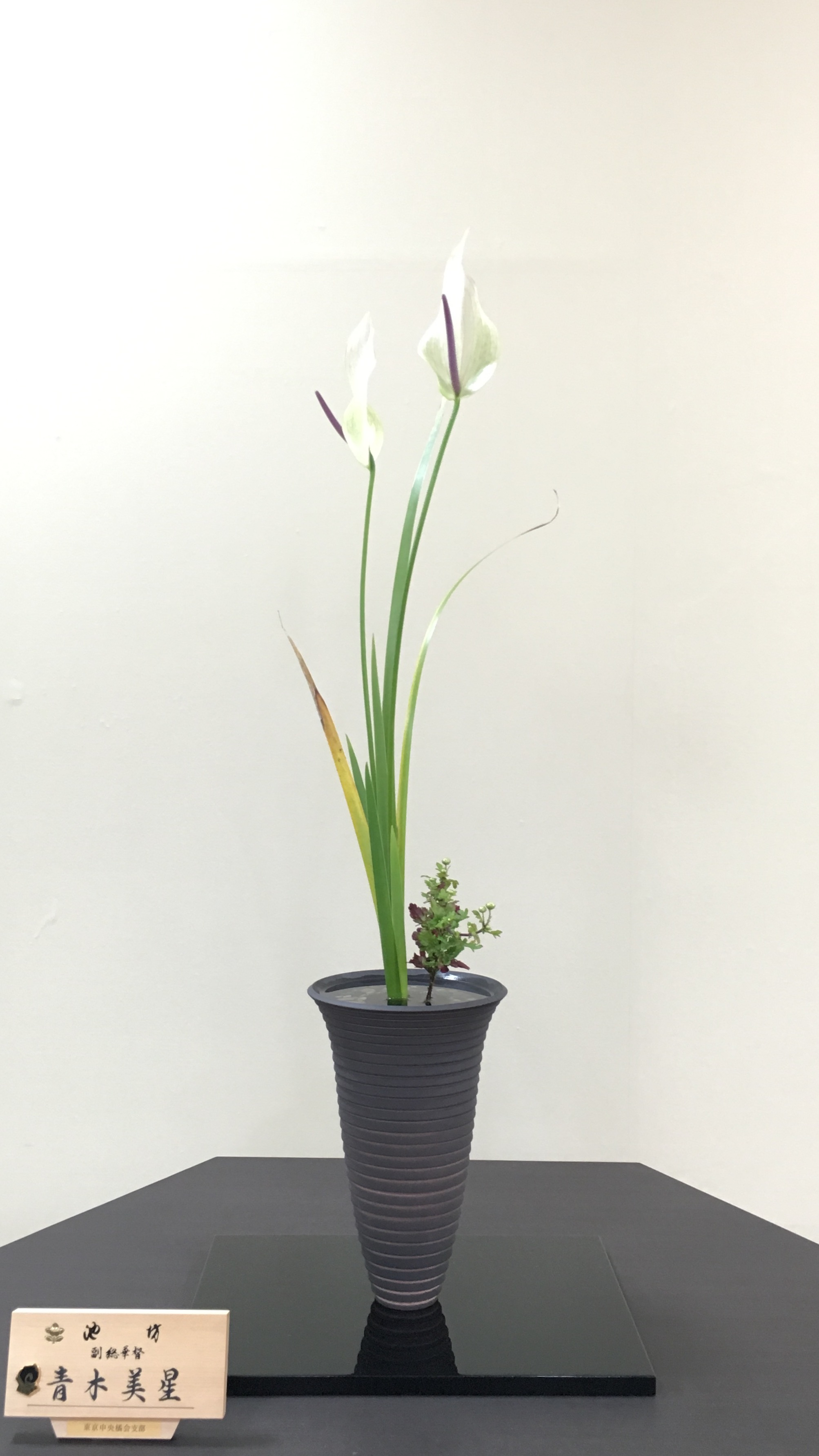
Modern Shōka from the Ikenobō

== See also ==
- Moribana
