= Sasaoka =

Sasaoka may refer to:

== People ==
- Shigezō Sasaoka (笹岡 繁蔵; 1948–1998), Japanese voice actor
- Shinji Sasaoka (佐々岡 真司; born 1967), Japanese baseball pitcher

== Others ==
- Mishō-ryū Sasaoka, Japanese school of ikebana
