= Kyoto school (art) =

Styles of Japanese painting of the late Edo period

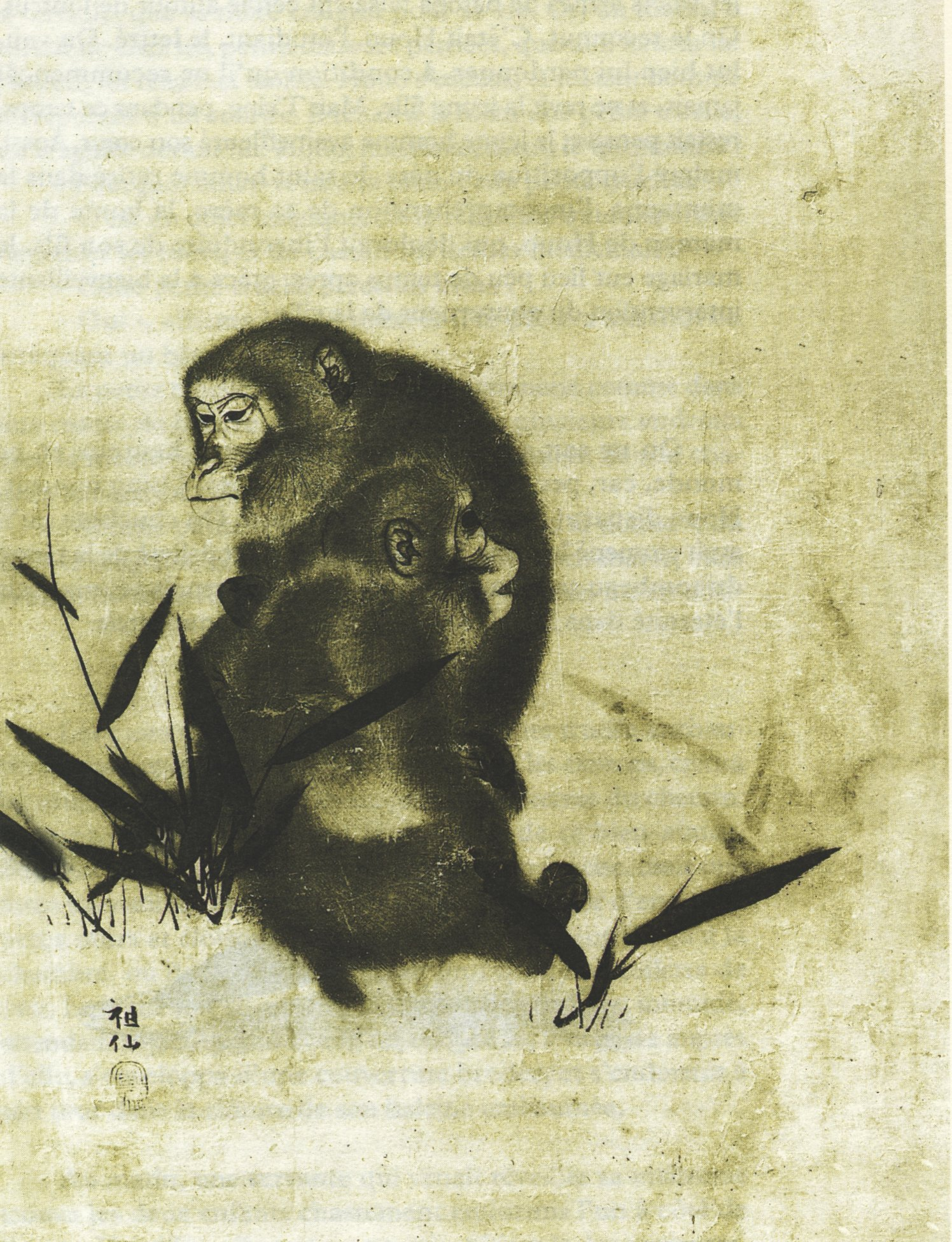
Monkeys by Mori Sosen

The Kyoto school (京都派 -ha) was a collection of several styles and schools of Japanese painting of the late Edo period. Though there are many broad similarities between the styles within the school, these styles display key differences that separate them. Many were in fact reactions to one another, an artist or group of artists seeking to express themselves differently from those around them. Those subscribers of the Kyoto school found themselves at odds with the state sanctioned Kanō school, thus contributing to the vague nature of the former.

Kakuzo Okakura, predominant Japanese art historian of the late nineteenth and early twentieth centuries, traced the origins of the Kyoto school to the schools of both Manchu-shin and Ming dynasties in China. The two latter schools focused on the power of the artist as a lay person or scholar, as opposed to a professional. Okakura noted Kyoto school's attempts to repurpose the Japanese tradition of copying works from other (predominantly Chinese) cultures, a technique known as utsushi. Unlike the bold and colorful style of the Kanō school or the restrained elegance of Tan'yu school, the Kyoto style favored surreal and elongated forms.

One of the more prominent schools under the Kyoto school umbrella was the Shijō school, named after the street where many of the artists had their studios. Shijō (四条) literally translates to 'fourth avenue.' This school, which was established by Matsumura Goshun, sought to produce a synthesis of the more realistic style of Maruyama Ōkyo with that of the nanga or Southern School styles. The Shijō style had an urban character and predated the Japanese and Chinese artists a century later in anticipating the need to use styles that appeal to an emergent bourgeois class. Mori Sosen was one of the more prominent painters in the Shijō school.

The nanga or Southern School, meanwhile, rebelled against the realism of Ōkyo and the Shijō artists, seeking to return to the inspiration and style of China's Southern School.

The Kyoto tradition is evidenced in the ceramic art of potters of the Kiyomizu and Awata kilns, which specialized in enameled porcelains and pottery, respectively.

== See also ==
- Kanō school
- Hara school
- Tosa school
