= Ko-ryū Toyokai =

Japanese school of ikebana

Ko-ryū Toyokai (古流東洋会) is a Japanese school of ikebana. It was founded in 1960 by Risshun Hattori (服部理春). Ko-ryū Toyokai teaches and practices multiple forms of ikebana, including moribana, nageire, traditional Ko-ryū-style seika, and a unique style called suibokuka (水墨花, meaning 'ink flowers').
