= Mishō-ryū =

School of Japanese floral art

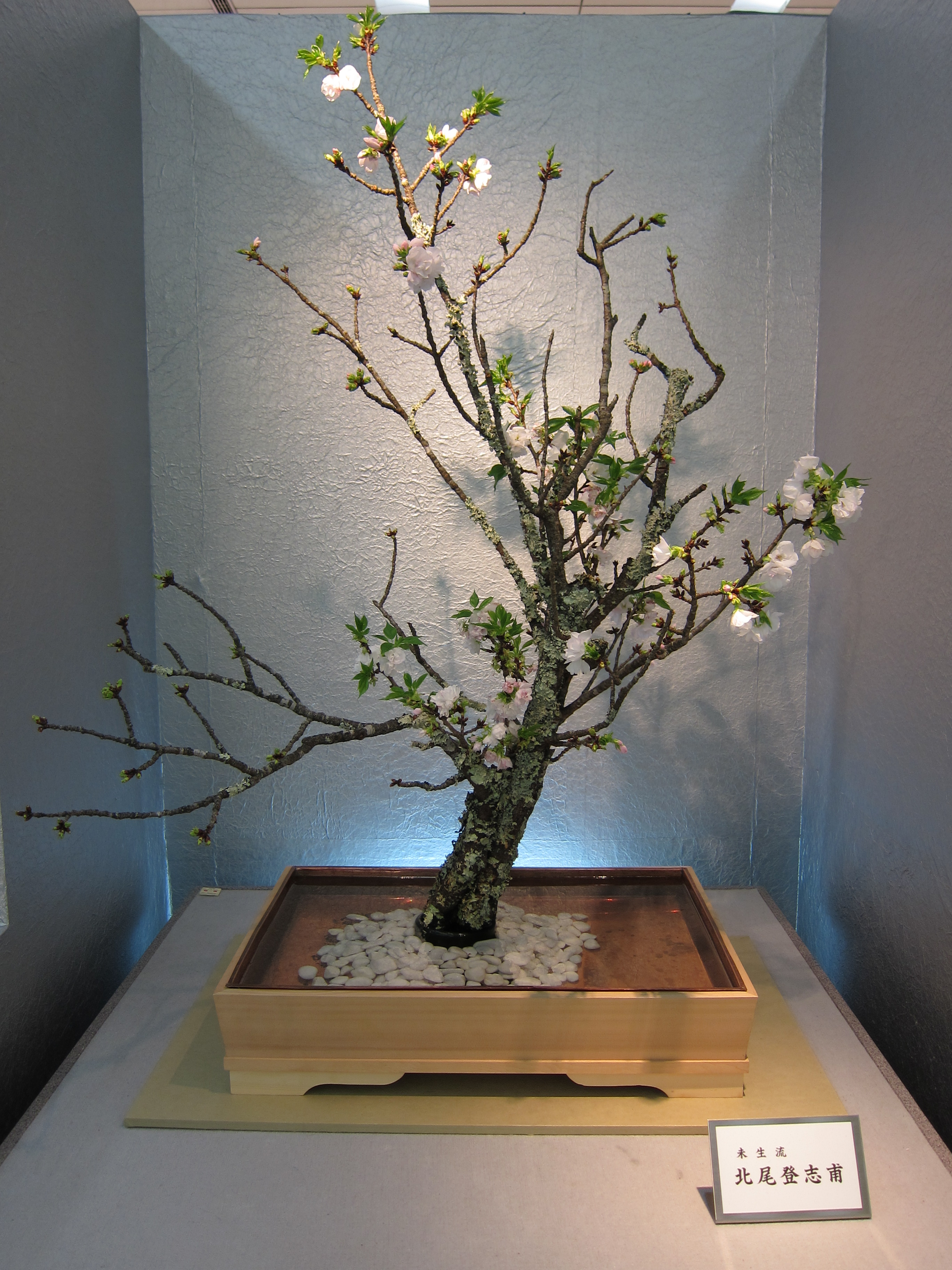
A classical kakubana arrangement of the Mishō-ryū

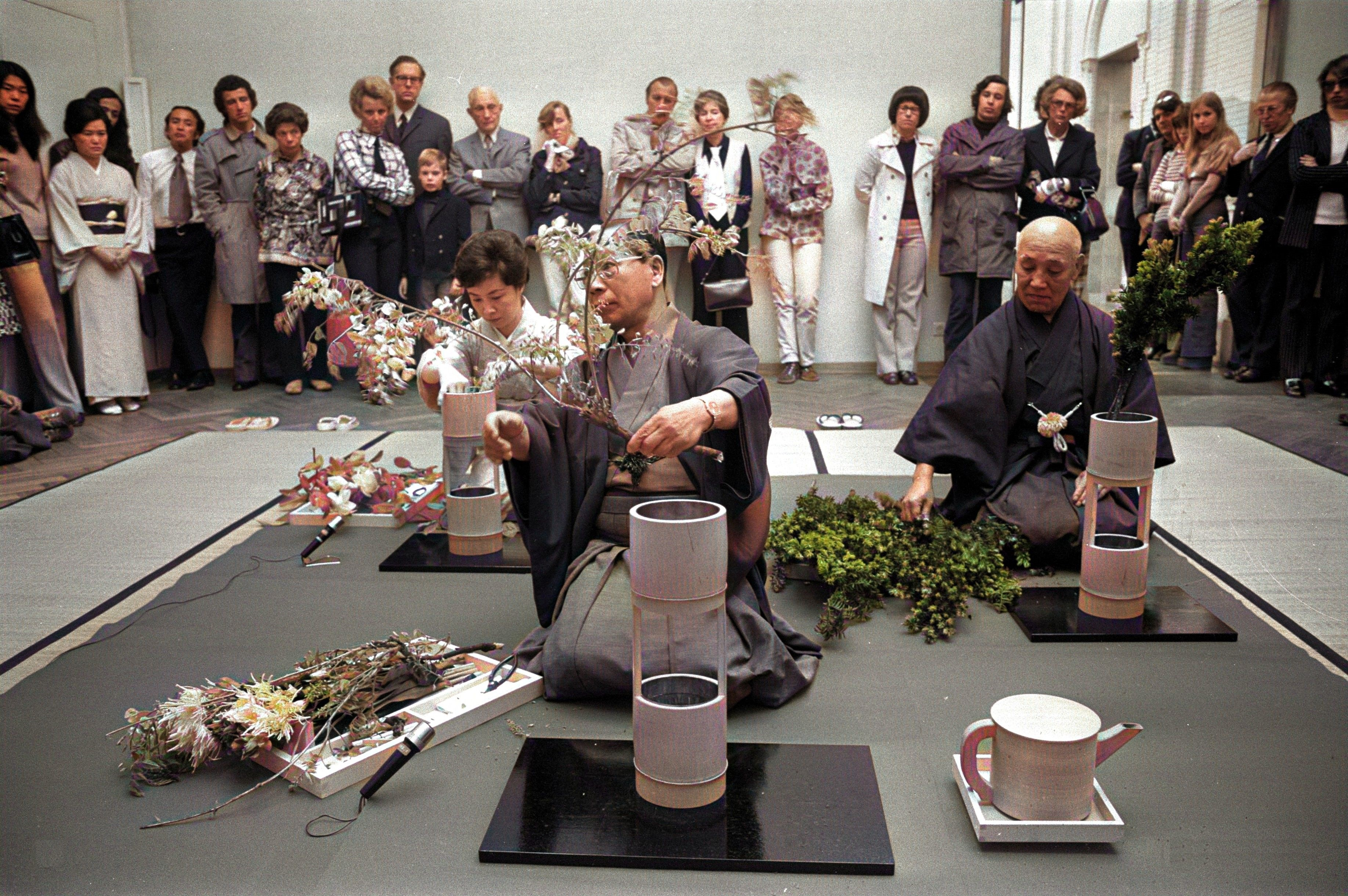
Demonstration of Mishō-ryū masters at the Stedelijk Museum Amsterdam during the Floriade 1972

Mishō-ryū (未生流) is a school of Ikebana, or Japanese floral art.

== History ==
It was established by Mishōsai Ippo in 1807 in the late Edo period in Osaka. He established the defining philosophy and style of the school. At the time of its establishment, the culture of the townspeople was greatly developed, and many disciples gathered from there.

Over the years that followed, there was a period of decline, but Mishō-ryū became known throughout western Japan with its activities mainly in the Kinki region. In the modern Shōwa era, the city was proud of its prosperity before the war, but was caught up in World War II and declined. After the war, it was a force to be reckoned with again.

The founder Mishōsai Ippo initially practiced kadō, and in doing so, he turned the religious ideas of Confucianism, Taoism, and Buddhism into his fundamental ideas. In addition, the idea of finding peace of mind through flower arranging was integrated into the philosophy of the school.

== Styles ==
The traditional style is called kakubana (格花), which is also known as Seika in other schools. The principle is to create an arrangement in the shape of a right-angled isosceles triangle. The style is characterized by a sense of spirituality and an awareness of "Heaven, Earth, Human" (天地人 Tenchijin), the three essential elements that make up the human universe. These are represented by various axis of the arrangement.

Heika (瓶花) is taught based on the principles of Nageirebana.

Later the modern style developed which is called shin-ka (新花).

Another style, Sasaoka, was founded by Chikuho Sasaoka in 1919.
