= Matsumura Keibun =

Japanese painter

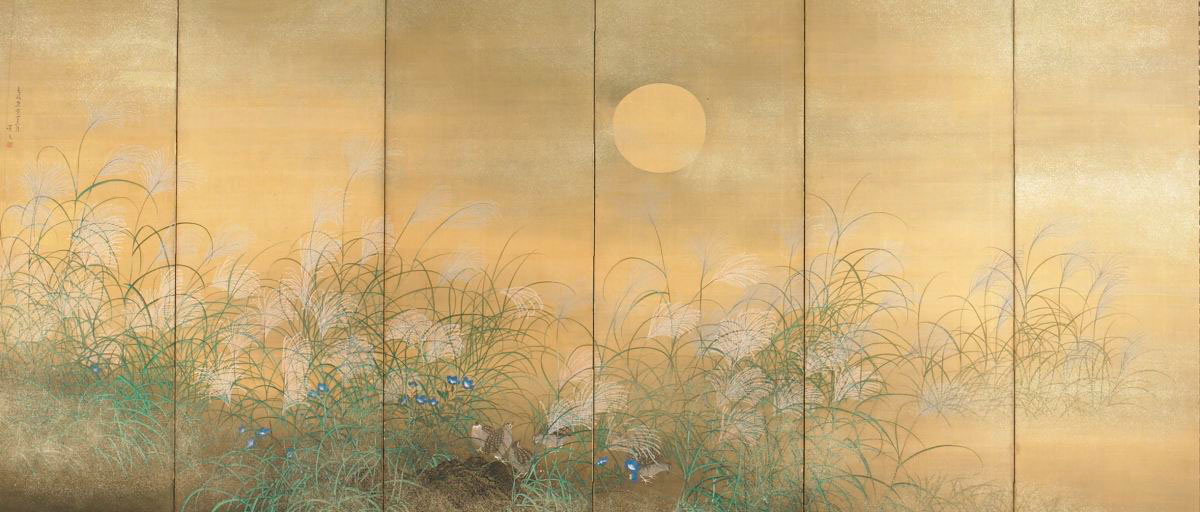
- Quail Feeding Among the Susuki and Kikyō (folding screen)
- Born: 1779; Kyōto
- Died: May 25, 1843 (aged 63–64); Kyōto
- Occupation: Painter

Matsumura Keibun (Japanese: 松村 景文) (1779, Kyōto - 25 May 1843, Kyōto) was a Japanese painter.

== Life and work ==
His father died when he was two years old. He was younger half-brother to Matsumura Goshun, founder of the Shijō school, and received his first art lessons from him. He exhibited his works as early as 1796, under the auspices of Minagawa Kein, a showing which included calligraphy. Keibun inherited Goshun's studio when he died in 1811. By 1813, he was listed in a directory of Kyōto's most notable citizens.

In 1818, for the seventh anniversary of his half-brother's death, he staged an exhibition of his works. In 1829, he painted a group of birds on the ceiling inside of the "Naginata-Hoko" (長刀鉾; roughly, Long Sword Halberd), one of the floats for the Gion Matsuri (festival), which is still in use today.

In 1830, he published an illustrated book; "Go Keibun gafu" (呉景文画譜, Keibun's Art of Painting), which was a significant contribution to establishing Goshun's style. After his death, he was initially interred at the Daitsū-ji, an Ōtani-ha temple, but was later moved to the Konpuku-ji, a more prestigious Zen temple.

His style is similar to Goshun's, but somewhat lighter and what, in Western art, would be called manneristic. His best known works are a set of fusumas (sliding doors) in Myōhō–ji, a Nichiren temple, which are called Shiki kōsaku-zu (四季耕作図; roughly, "Cultivation in the Four Seasons"). He also specialized in paintings of birds and flowers.

His work is kept in several museums, including the British Museum, the Seattle Art Museum, the Birmingham Museum of Art, the Metropolitan Museum of Art, the Portland Art Museum, the Brooklyn Museum, the Tokyo Fuji Art Museum, the Museum of Fine Arts, Boston, the Indianapolis Museum of Art, the Minneapolis Institute of Art, the University of Michigan Museum of Art, and the Honolulu Museum of Art.

== Sources ==
- Tazawa, Yutaka: "Matsumura Keibun". In: Biographical Dictionary of Japanese Art. Kodansha International, 1981. ISBN 0-87011-488-3.
- Laurance P. Roberts: "Keibun". In: A Dictionary of Japanese Artists. Weatherhill, 1976. ISBN 0-8348-0113-2.
