= Shijō school =

Japanese Art School

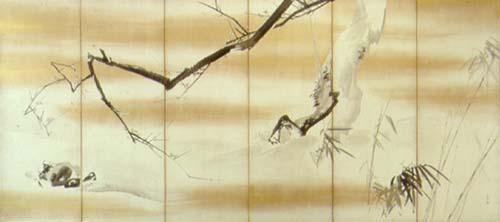
Pine, Bamboo, Plum, by Maruyama Ōkyo. One of two sixfold screens.

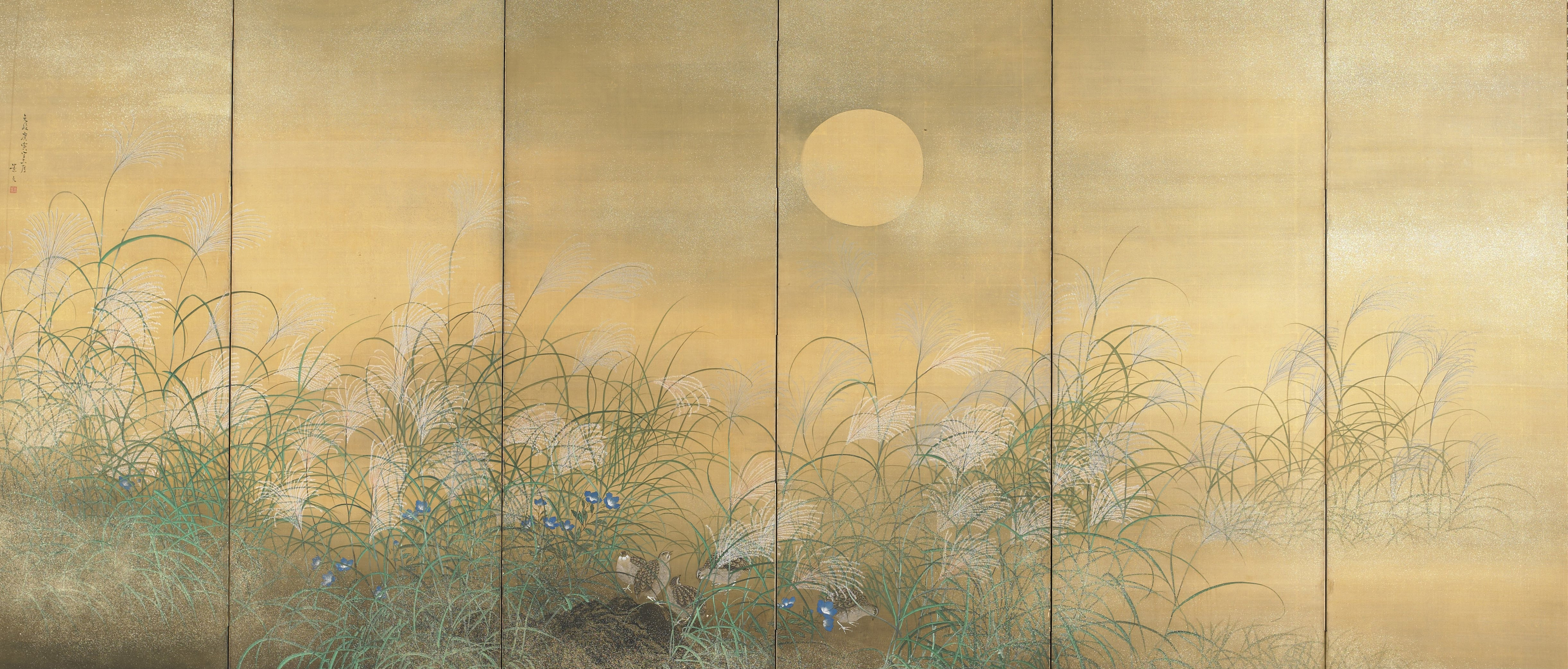
Quail Feeding Amidst Susuki and Kikyo, by Matsumura Keibun (1830)

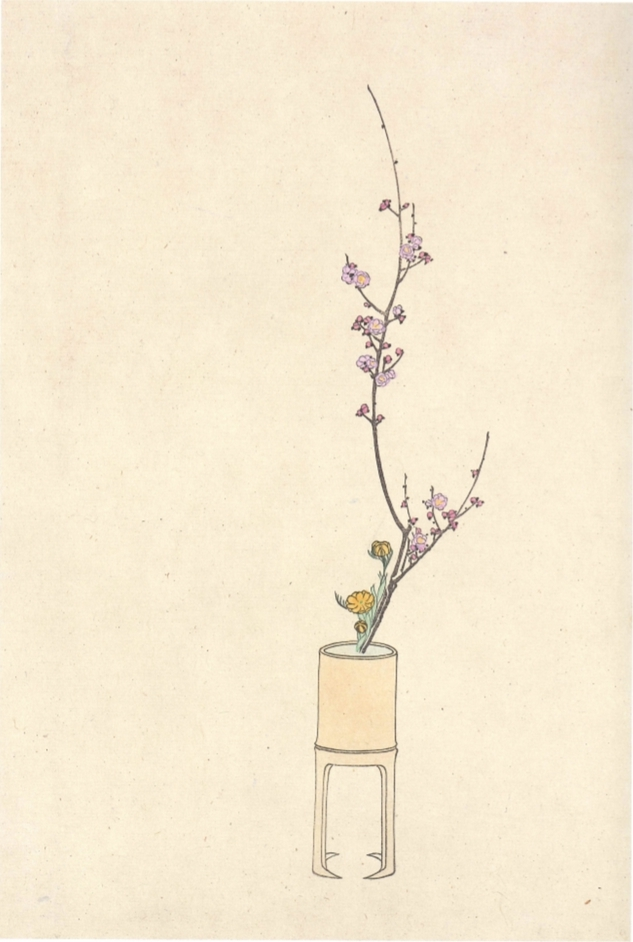
Shōka arrangement by the 40th headmaster Ikenobō Senjō, from the Sōka Hyakki, by Matsumura Keibun and Yokoyama Seiki (1820)

The Shijō school (四条派, Shijō-ha), also known as the Maruyama–Shijō school, was a Japanese school of painting.

== History ==
It was an offshoot school of the Maruyama school of Japanese painting founded by Maruyama Ōkyo, and his former student Matsumura Goshun in the late 18th century. This school was one of several that made up the larger Kyoto school. The school is named after the Shijō Street ("Fourth Avenue") in Kyoto where many major artists were based. Its primary patrons were rich merchants in and around Kyoto/Osaka and also appealed to the kamigata who were of the established aristocrat and artisan families of the Imperial capital during the late 18th/19th centuries.

== Style ==
Stylistically, the Shijō style can best be described as a synthesis of two rival styles of the time. Maruyama Ōkyo was an experienced and expert painter of sumi-e ink paintings, and accomplished a great degree of realism in his creations, emphasizing direct observation of depicted subjects which was a direct contravention of the officially sponsored schools of the time, Kanō and Tosa, which emphasized decorativeness with highly formalized and stylized figures taught to its students via copying paintings of past masters. The Kanō and Tosa schools had become bywords for rigid formalism by this time. Meanwhile, a number of artists, rebelling against Ōkyo's realism, formed the nanga ("southern pictures") school, basing their style largely on the Southern school of Chinese painting. The artists of the Shijō school sought to reconcile the differences between these two styles, creating works that synthesized the best elements of both.

The school's style focuses on a Western-influenced objective realism, but achieved with traditional Japanese painting techniques. It concentrates less on the exact depiction of its subject, but rather on expressing the inner spirit and usually has an element of playfulness and humor compared to the Maruyama school. Popular motifs include tranquil landscapes, kachō (bird and flower), animals, and traditional subjects from Chinese poetic and Confucian lore, but there is generally little or no interest in legends, history, or classical literature.

== Artists ==
One of the most well-known Shijō artists in the West is Mori Sosen, who is known for his great number of paintings of monkeys. Shibata Zeshin is also closely associated with the Shijō school, though he worked in many other styles and mediums, most notably lacquer objects and lacquer painting.

- Matsumura Goshun
- Matsumura Keibun
- Maruyama Ōkyo
- Mori Sosen
- Kikuchi Yōsai
- Ohara Shoson (Koson)
- Shibata Zeshin
- Watanabe Kazan
