= Maruyama Ōkyo =

Japanese artist (1733–1795)

- 円山 応挙
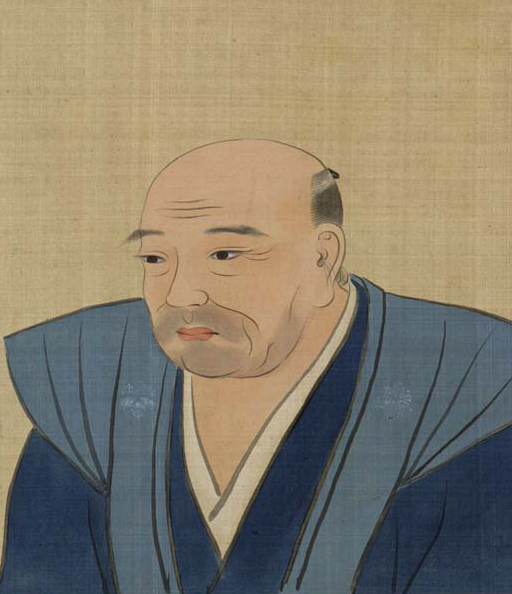
- Born: Maruyama Masataka; 12 June 1733; Ano-o, Kameoka, Kyoto, Japan
- Died: 31 August 1795 (aged 62)
- Movement: Maruyama school

Maruyama Ōkyo (円山 応挙; Japanese pronunciation: [ma.ɾɯ.ja.ma (|) oꜜː.kʲo, ma.ɾɯ.ja.ma (|) oː.kʲo], June 12, 1733 – August 31, 1795), born Maruyama Masataka, was a Japanese artist active in the late 18th century. He moved to Kyoto, during which he studied artworks from Chinese, Japanese and Western sources. A personal style of Western naturalism mixed with Eastern decorative design emerged, and Ōkyo founded the Maruyama school of painting. Although many of his fellow artists criticized his work as too slavishly devoted to natural representation, it proved a success with laypeople.

== Early career ==
Ōkyo was born into a farming family in Ano-o, in present-day Kameoka, Kyoto. As a teenager, he moved to Kyoto and joined the townspeople (chōnin) class. He apprenticed for a toy shop, where he painted the faces onto dolls. The shop began selling European stereoscopes, novelties that when looked into presented the illusion of a three-dimensional image. It was Ōkyo's first look at Western-style perspective, and in 1767 he tried his hand at one of the images. He created Harbour View, a small picture in single-point perspective. Ōkyo soon mastered the techniques of drawing stereoscope images (megane-e, eyeglass pictures).

Ōkyo decided to pursue a career as an artist. He first studied under Ishida Yūtei, a member of the Kanō school and ultimately a bigger influence on Ōkyo than the stereoscope images. During these formative years, Ōkyo studied Chinese painting as well. He particularly admired the works of Qian Xuan, a 13th-century painter known for his detailed flower drawings, and Qiu Ying, a 16th-century figure painter. In fact, the "kyo" in Ōkyo's name was adopted in tribute to Ch'ien Hsüan. Ōkyo even briefly adopted the Chinese practice of signing his name with one character, so for a time he was known as Ōkyo En. He studied the works of Shen Quan, a Chinese artist who lived in Nagasaki from 1731 to 1733 and painted images of flowers. However, Ōkyo did not like the artist's treatment of proportion, preferring the works of Watanabe Shikō. He also studied Ming and Qing paintings. Perhaps most significantly, Ōkyo eagerly studied any Western paintings or prints he could find.

== Success ==
Ōkyo's first major commission came in 1768 from Yūjō, abbot of a temple in Ōtsu called Enman'in. Over the next three years, Ōkyo painted The Seven Misfortunes and Seven Fortunes, a depiction of the results of both bad and good karma. The three scrolls total about 148 ft (45 m) in length. Ōkyo tried to find models for the people depicted in them, even for the shocking images such as a man being ripped in two by frightened bulls. His introduction to the work states that he believed that people needed to see reality, not imaginary images of Nirvana or Hell, if they were to truly believe in Buddhist principles.

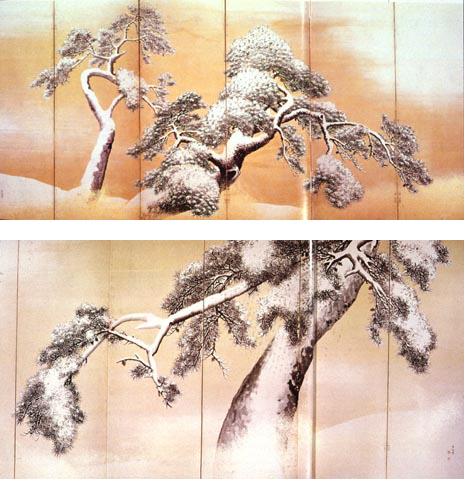
Pine Trees, c. 1780; pair of sixfold screens.

Other painters were critical of Ōkyo's style. They found it to be overly concerned with physical appearances, alleging that he was too beholden to the real world and produced undignified works. Nevertheless, his style proved popular with the public, and commissions came in to do Western-style landscapes, decorative screens, and nudes. He did life drawings and used them for material in his paintings. Ōkyo was probably the first Japanese artist to do life drawings from nude models. The subject was still considered pornographic in Japan. During his career he painted for wealthy merchants, the shogunate, even the emperor.

The public's perception of Ōkyo's skill is evident in a legend recounted by Van Briessen. The story goes that a daimyō commissioned Ōkyo to paint a "ghost image" of a lost family member. Once the work was completed, the ghost image came off the painting and flew away.

== Maruyama school ==
Success prompted Ōkyo to start a school in Kyoto, where he could teach his new style. He was a talented art teacher, and he soon took on many students. He taught them to rely on nature to render images in a realistic picture of light, shadow, and forms. The school grew popular, and branches soon appeared in other locations, including Osaka. Much of the school's work is today preserved at Daijō-ji, a temple in Kasumi (Hyōgo Prefecture). Noteworthy pupils include Ōkyo's son, Maruyama Ōzui, Nagasawa Rosetsu, and Matsumura Goshun.

Goshun joined Ōkyo's school in 1787. That year, the Maruyama school took a commission to paint screens for Daijō-ji. Later that year, Kyoto suffered a devastating fire, so Ōkyo and Goshun moved into a temple called Kiunin. The two became fast friends, and Ōkyo refused to regard their relationship as that of a teacher and student. Goshun later went on to found the Shijō school.

== Style ==
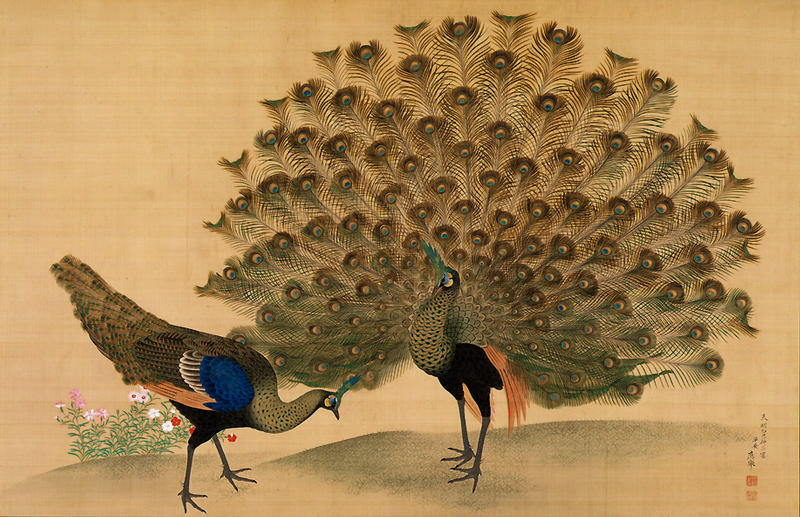
Peacock and Peahen; hanging scroll; color on silk

Maruyama style is a school of painting founded by the mid-Edo period painter Maruyama Okyo. One of the leading schools of early modern Japanese painting, the Maruyama style was based on the realistic sensibilities of the emerging townships of Kyoto in the mid-18th century and had a major influence on Japanese painting with its new style that fused realism with traditional decorative elements. It is characterised by the use of a technique known as tsukeitate, in which a frame is not drawn and ink shading is added.

Ōkyo's painting style merged a tranquil version of Western naturalism with the Eastern decorative painting of the Kanō school. His works show a Western understanding of highlight and shadow. His realism differed from previous Japanese schools in its devotion to nature as the ultimate source with no regard for sentiment. Ōkyo's intricately detailed plant and animal sketches show a great influence from European nature drawings. An album of leaves in the Nishimura Collection in Kyoto (now in handscroll form) depicts several animals and plants, each labeled as if in European guidebook.

Still, Ōkyo's works remain Japanese. Unlike European painting, Ōkyo's images have very few midtones. Moreover, he follows the Eastern tradition in depicting objects with very little setting; often his pictures feature a single subject on a plain background. The result is a more immediate naturalism with a decorative and reflective feel. This was achieved through skillful brush handling; Ōkyo painted with a broad, flat brush, which he would load with more paint on one side. This created broad strokes that vary in paint coverage. Nature was not his only subject; many works by Ōkyo depict normal scenes from life in Kyoto's commercial area.

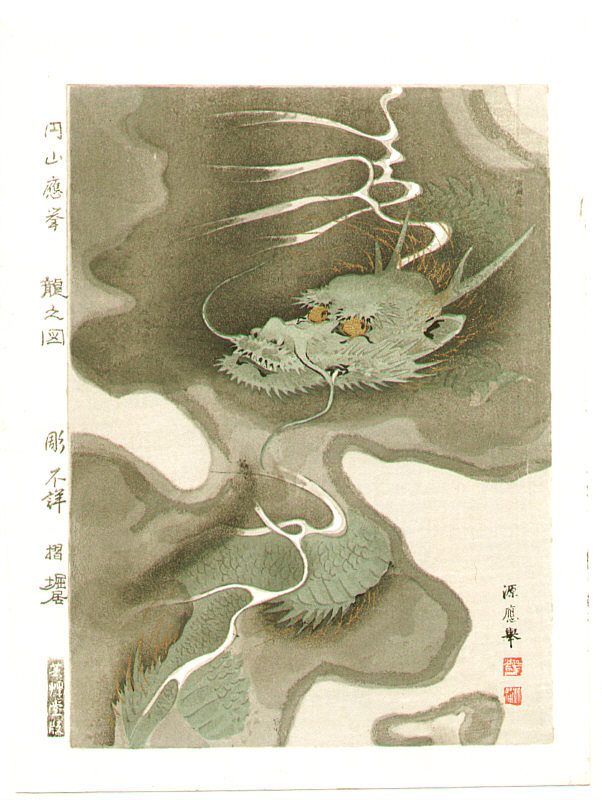
Dragon

His Geese Alighting on Water, painted at Enman'in, Ōtsu in 1767, is an early example of his mature style. The subject is treated as a part of nature; nothing philosophical is implied as had been done with such imagery in the East Asian tradition. Likewise, Kingfisher and Trout, painted in 1769, features a bird near the top of the image, waiting for a fish. The trout swims under a large rock near the center. Bird, fish, and stone all appear as they do in nature, creating a matter-of-fact, comprehensible, and natural-looking piece. Later in his oeuvre, Pine Trees in Snow, executed in 1773 for the wealthy Mitsui family, is realistic despite being in the Japanese idiom of ink on a gold background. The two six-panel screens show tree bark and pine needles separated by differing brush strokes, and the white snow seems to weigh down the branches. The bark is painted in the tsuketate technique, which uses no outlines, just dark and light shades to create the illusion of volume.

Hozu Rapids, painted in 1795, is one of Ōkyo's later works. On two eightfold screens it depicts a tree and a cluster of rocks with some dragons. The work thus shows Ōkyo's ability to render the natural elements in a convincingly realistic fashion. However, the dragons, according to art critics such as Paine, demonstrate a weakness; they are treated academically, thus losing their grand, legendary essence.

== See also ==
- Yūrei-zu
