= Nobuaki Kojima =

Japanese contemporary artist

Nobuaki Kojima (Kojima Nobuaki, Japanese: 小島 信明, born 1935, Fukui Prefecture) is a contemporary Japanese artist from Ōno, Fukui. His work is often understood through a dialogue with American pop art, although Kojima has rejected the identification with pop art. He is perhaps most recognized for his “Standing Figure” works, nearly life-sized sculptures of businessmen with red-and-white striped cloth draped over their heads. This iconography, with the cloth's evocation of the U.S. flag, made the artist into a focal point of international exchanges involving the American artist Jasper Johns and William Lieberman, curator of the Museum of Modern Art (MoMA) in New York City, eventually making Kojima an indispensable presence in Tokyo pop. He also made paintings and occasionally gave performance. As of 2014, he is based in Kodaira, Tokyo.

== Early life ==
Kojima grew up in Ōno City until he was sixteen, where his father and uncle made ceramic roof tiles. Because Ōno City was located in the mountains, Kojima did not directly experience any air raids during World War II. In junior high school he had an art teacher whom he credits with his initial interest in art by, among other things, introducing him to painters like Pablo Picasso and Henri Matisse. He visited Fukui to attend art exhibitions. After graduating junior high school, he entered Ono High school but transferred to Osaka City Kogei High School because it emphasized art education. Thus, at the age of sixteen Kojima moved to Osaka alone to pursue art. After graduating in 1955, Kojima then went to Tokyo to study at the Tokyo University of the Arts. He worked for the painter Susumu Miyazaki in Kagurazaka among other artistic odd jobs.

== Career ==
He first exhibited at the Yomiuri Indépendant Exhibition during its 10th edition in 1958 where he exhibited a painting inspired by surrealism and magazine imagery. By a few years later in 1960 and 1961, Kojima was focusing less on painting and more on sculptures using readymade objects. At the 14th Yomiuri Independent exhibition in 1962, Kojima himself stood in an empty oil drum with a pole draped in cloth during the exhibition’s open hours. This performance gained attention from other artists exhibiting in the Independent and preceding Gilbert and George’s notion of “living sculpture.” Kojima exhibited at the Yomiuri Independent annually from 1958 to 1963. Through his participation in these exhibitions, he befriended many like-minded artists of his generation, including Ushio Shinohara. He notes in particular his relationships with Yasunao Tone and Takehisa Kosugi and other members of Group Ongaku during this time. Through them, he also became acquainted with Yoko Ono and attended many events at the Sogetsu Art Center. At this time, in 1962, he has noted being particularly impressed by a visitation by John Cage and David Tudor to the Tokyo Bunka Kaikan.

Kojima’s 1962 performance would subsequently inform his “standing figure” sculptures, dated two years later, for which he is more widely recognized today. The figures in these works, resembling something like a Japanese salaryman, was emblematic of Japan’s rapid postwar economic development under American reconstruction. The “standing figures” are draped with a red and white striped banner which is typically taken to signify the American flag. However, the star-spangled portion of the America flag is missing from the Kojima’s cloth. Originally, the material used in the 1962 performance that inspired the sculptures was an appropriated, red and white striped fabric often used in Japanese ceremonies. They were sometimes installed in groups or in combination with other accompanying works.

In 1964 Kojima exhibited his “standing figure” works at Tsubaki Kindai Gallery. The show was visited by Jasper Johns and Yoshiaki Tono, when Johns was touring in Tokyo. On November 28 of this same year, Kojima shared the stage of Sogetsu Arts Center with Robert Rauschenberg, Ushio Shinohara, and the art critic Tono Yoshiaki for “Twenty Questions to Bob Rauschenberg.” On stage also appeared Shinohara’s “Marcel Duchamp Thinking” (Shinko suru Maruseru Dyushan), 1963, and one of Kojima’s standing figures. While the Japanese interlocutors asked Rauschenberg questions he silently worked on a Combine, “Gold Standard,” 1964, using things he had collected during his visit to Tokyo. In 1966 his “standing figure” work was featured in the “New Japanese Painting & Sculpture” at the Museum of Modern Art.

In September 1967, his was work also featured in the Fifth Biennale de Paris, where Yusuke Nakahara was the Japanese commissioner. His paintings from the period often contain flat portions of highlighter blue stains which other flat, graphic shapes appear to be superimposed or cut out. The paintings also often contain sculptural elements. In 1969, he married a Newsweek reporter and graduate of Sophia University's English program, and she traveled with him. From 1972 to 1976, Kojima lived in New York pursuing an artistic career although he considered this effort to be a failure. Before he left, he was included in SculptureCenter’s 1976 exhibition, “12 Japanese Sculptors.”

His work is collected by the Fukui Fine Arts Museum where his untitled standing figure sculpture was voted third favorite in the collection under the “Contemporary art, 3D, and photography” category during the Fukui Prefectural Museum‘s 30th anniversary survey. More recently, a 1976 figure was shown at the Walker Arts Center’s “International Pop” exhibition, part of the museum’s permanent collection since 2016. An untitled standing figure was prominently featured on the cover of New York Times Arts & Leisure section for the story on the exhibition, “When The World Went Pop.”
