= Yomiuri Indépendant Exhibition =

Japanese arts exhibition, 1949-1963

Yomiuri Indépendant Exhibition 読売アンデパンダン展
- Genre: Unjuried art exhibition
- Frequency: Annual
- Locations: Tokyo Metropolitan Art Museum, Tokyo, Japan
- Inaugurated: 1949
- Most recent: 1963
- Organizer: Yomiuri Shimbun newspaper

The Yomiuri Indépendant Exhibition (読売アンデパンダン展, Yomiuri Andepandan Ten), affectionately nicknamed "Yomiuri Anpan," was a famously permissive, unjuried, free-to-exhibit art exhibition held annually in Tokyo, Japan from 1949 to 1963. Sponsored by the Yomiuri Shimbun newspaper, the exhibition was held at the Tokyo Metropolitan Art Museum and played an important role in the emergence of postwar avant-garde and contemporary art in Japan.

Historian Thomas Havens has called the Yomiuri Indépendant "the chief vehicle of postwar democracy for young visual artists in Japan who lacked connections with the clubby fine arts establishment" and "a bazaar of new ideas and materials." Among artists who exhibited artworks at the Yomiuri Indépendant included Genpei Akasegawa, Shūsaku Arakawa, Nobuaki Kojima, Tetsumi Kudо̄, the Kyūshū-ha group, Natsuyuki Nakanishi, Tarō Okamoto, Ushio Shinohara, Mitsuko Tabe, Jirō Takamatsu, Katsuhiro Yamaguchi, and Jirō Yoshihara.

== Establishment ==
The Yomiuri Indépendant Exhibition was established by the Yomiuri Shimbun newspaper in 1949 in an effort to "democratize the art world" and foster free thinking and free expression. The mastermind behind the exhibition was journalist Hideo Kaidō, a member of the Yomiuri's Culture Section. Kaidō detested the prewar hierarchy in Japanese fine art, in which small cliques of artists and art critics known informally as the Gadan (画壇) effectively controlled access to juried exhibitions such as the government-sponsored Nitten Exhibition and selectively advanced the careers of chosen protégés while blocking the paths of others. For its part, the management of the Yomiuri newspaper hoped that by sponsoring the exhibition the paper would harvest positive public relations and distance itself from the paper's recent collaboration with Japan's authoritarian wartime regime.

Originally, the exhibition was called the Nihon Indépendant Exhibition (Nihon Andepandan Ten), but this title was vigorously protested by the Japan Communist Party-affiliated Japan Fine Arts Association (Nihon Bijitsukai), which used the same name for its own exhibition. Finally in 1957, the Yomiuri relented and changed the name to "Yomiuri Indépendant," at which time the problem of the two rival "Nihon Indépendant" exhibitions was finally resolved. Around this same time, artists began to affectionately nickname the show the "Yomiuri Anpan." "Anpan" was an abbreviation of "Andepandan," but also a deliberate pun on sweet red bean buns, called "anpan" in Japanese.

== Revolutionary space ==
In the early years, the works shown at the exhibition tended to be rather conventional paintings submitted by older, well-established artists and artistic amateurs. However, in the second half of the 1950s, the exhibition gradually transformed into an artistic revolutionary space.

In the late 1950s, it was still extremely difficult for unestablished younger artists to have their artworks shown in public venues. Access to galleries and exhibitions was restricted by selection committees dominated by established art societies that often screened entries in accordance with personal connections and ideologically-driven standards. Among the two independent, unjuried exhibitions at that time, the Nihon Indépendant was dominated by socialist realism, reflecting its close association with the Communist Party and prevailing art trends at the time, leaving Yomiuri Indépendant as one of the only choices for aspiring young artists outside of the socialist realist mainstream to show their work.

For example Genpei Akasegawa, a younger, unestablished artist at that time, initially submitted works to Nihon Indépendant, but felt increasingly unwelcome there amidst pressure to conform to socialist realist artistic orthodoxy. Although Akasegawa and other artists initially resisted submitting to the Yomiuri Indépendant because its corporate sponsorship by a major mainstream newspaper represented an affiliation with capitalism that was unpalatable to many artists, the narrow orthodoxy of the Nihon Indépendant made the Yomiuri Indépendant their only remaining choice. Artist Ushio Shinohara later recalled, "We entered our works into the Yomiuri Indépendant because that was the only place we could show them. There were hardly any museums or galleries in those days, and no patrons."

For many of these younger artists, the two weeks of the Yomiuri Indépendant constituted the premier event of the year, and they would spend much of the rest of the year preparing to showcase their creativity and hopefully one-up their peers in terms of daring and audacity. Akasegawa later recalled how in the final years of the 1950s, a sort of competition emerged at the Yomiuri Indépendant to see whose “painting” could extrude most from the surface of the canvas. First the artists used sand, then glass and nails, and then larger and larger “found objects” until finally the objects escaped the picture frame entirely and “slipped free of the canvas to stand proudly on the floor.” By 1958, the traditional artists had abandoned the exhibition, leaving behind radical new forms of painting, bizarre assemblages of found objects, and strange installations. By 1959, the art critic Tamon Miki declared that the Yomiuri Indépendant gave him "the feeling of a performance space rather than of an exhibition site."

== Cancellation ==
Over time the management of the Tokyo Metropolitan Art Museum began to balk at some of the more extreme artworks submitted to the Yomiuri Indépendant. In 1958, the Exhibition saw its first rejected artwork, when the Kyūshū-ha group tried to display a work called Garbage Artwork that consisted of a pile of actual garbage. During the 1962 event, museum curators summarily removed artist Ushio Nakazawa's vinyl bag of red ink, over which visitors were supposed to walk and thereby "create art" by tracking red ink all over the museum. Later that year, the museum issued an edict banning a number of objects and artworks from its premises, including certain types of nude photographs deemed obscene, swords and other weapons, foodstuffs that might smell or rot, works producing loud noises, and artworks using water, sand, gravel or other materials that were damaging the museum floors and walls. Art critics including Shūzō Takiguchi, Ichirō Hariu, Yoshiaki Tōno, and Tamon Miki immediately protested these new restrictions, calling them "very troubling for freedom of expression," but to no avail. The artists themselves also protested, and police had to be called in to physically remove a group of artists dancing outside the museum in their underwear in protest. Artists also simply ignored the restrictions, and the 1963 edition of the exhibition (which proved to be the last) featured, among other forbidden objects, a bath bucket filled with water, knives, glass fragments, loud and raucous use of a steel drum, and artworks incorporating perishable foodstuffs, including a French roll, udon, bean sprouts, and tofu.

Barely a month before the 1964 Yomiuri Indépendant was scheduled to open, amid rumors that the upcoming artworks would be even wilder and more bizarre than ever before, the Yomiuri Shimbun suddenly announced that it was terminating its sponsorship of the exhibition, and when no new sponsor stepped forward, the Yomiuri Indépendant came to an end after 15 years of annual shows. In announcing the termination, the newspaper declared the exhibition's mission fully accomplished, stating, "We believe the time has come for artists to manage their own affairs. Confident that we've attained our objectives, we of the Yomiuri Shimbun have concluded our sponsorship with last year's exhibition." The newspaper had clearly concluded that it had milked the exhibition for as much positive public relations value as it could, and that continuing the exhibition amid anger from museum officials and complaints from museum visitors in fact risked negative publicity.

Many artists were stunned by the last-minute cancellation. Akasegawa noted ironically that by deliberately violating the museum's rules, "the unconscious destructive energy of the artworks had destroyed the space itself." Nevertheless, the Yomiuri was not incorrect in noting that the original objective of democratizing the art world had been achieved; by 1964, the Japanese art world was a vastly different space than it had been in the 1950s, one fundamentally more welcoming to avant-garde art. Indeed, the artists had little trouble finding alternative venues to display the works they had prepared for the 1964 Yomiuri Indépendant, showing them in a host of new, small-scale museums, galleries, and exhibitions that had cropped up in recent years.

== Legacy ==
Although short-lived, the Yomiuri Indépendant provided exposure and notoriety to a generation of younger artists who would later go on to achieve renown in both Japan and overseas. It also provided a space for these artists to network with each other, contributing to the formation of a number of art groups and collectives, including the Neo-Dada Organizers, the Kyūshū-ha, Group Ongaku, Zero Dimension, Jikan-ha, and Hi-Red Center. It fostered the emergence of new forms of anti-art, pop art, and performance art, as well as a group of art critics, art collectors, and gallery owners willing to accept, promote and patronize these artworks and artists. In these ways, the Yomiuri Indépendant played a crucial role in the emergence of postwar avant-garde art in Japan.
