= Mitsuko Tabe =

Japanese artist (1933–2024)

- Born: January 8, 1933; Taiwan
- Died: March 6, 2024 (aged 91)
- Occupation: Artist
- Known for: Paintings, performances, multimedia installations
- Movement: Group Kyushu

Mitsuko Tabe (田部 光子, Tabe Mitsuko; January 8, 1933 – 6 March 2024) was a Fukuoka-based multimedia artist and was a key member in the avant-garde art group Kyūshū-ha, active between 1957 and 1968. In her Kyūshu-ha period, Tabe investigated the issues related to environmentalism and the aspects of female identity, including sexuality, procreation, and social advancement. She has worked in a variety of mediums, ranging from painting to installation to performance. After the group's dissolution, Tabe continued to work independently and advocate for the visibility of female artists in Kyūshū.

== Biography ==
=== Early years ===
Mitsuko Tabe was born in Taitung in the Japan-occupied Taiwan in 1933. Her father, Kogoro Ishibashi, applied for a police officer position in Taiwan after the bankruptcy of the family’s sawmill, and subsequently moved the entire family there. Tabe lived in the countryside of Taiwan before the start of kindergarten and went to Taitung National School for elementary school. In her early years, the family traveled frequently between Taiwan and Japan, before settling back in Fukuoka after WWII in 1946. Tabe remembered staying for some time in Amagi, a smaller town near Fukuoka during her early years, and spending a lot of time learning sewing and dressmaking from her mother Rie.

In 1951, graduating from the Fukuoka Prefectural Ukiwa High School, Tabe began painting on her own. At around the same time she also started working in the sales section of a coal company in Fukuoka. After about two years, through her brother who was working in the personnel department of the famous Iwataya Department Store, Tabe was hired first as a temporary worker and soon was offered a full-time position as a sales clerk in 1953.

In the same year when she started working at Iwataya, Tabe joined the company’s French and painting circles, two of the company's hobby circles. These hobby circles, referred to as Saibi-kai, were established by the company for publicity purposes. Having eight or nine participants, the painting circle met a few times a week with a teacher and a nude model so that the circle members can practice drawing and painting regularly. Tabe drew the streets of downtown Fukuoka, where Iwataya was located, and worked on many paintings of landscape and daily objects. Tabe’s talent was soon recognized as her work was selected for the 13th Fukuoka Prefectural Exhibition (Fukuoka kenten) in 1953. While the painting circle was a great way to meet artistic companions, Tabe gradually distanced herself from Saibi-kai because she was dissatisfied with the instructor Aoki Hisashi, a Niki [Second Century] Society member, who would modify students’ paintings.

During her time at Iwataya, Tabe saw art frequently as the department store regularly hosted art exhibitions: as she later recalled, they included Western Female Artists Exhibition (西部女性展) and Art of Today's World Exhibition (世界今日の美術展), both held in the 1950s. In the building of Iwataya, there was a small gallery where Tabe first encountered future Kyūshū-ha members including Sakurai Takami, Ishibashi Yasuyuki, Ochi Osamu, and others. In 1957, there was a two-month-long strike organized by the employees against the Iwataya management. Although Tabe did not fully support the strikers, she herself did not go to the work. Tabe recalled that she was dubious of the union and found little difference between the placards of the rightwing and those of the labor movement. During that period, Tabe often visited the studio of Terada Ken’ichirō, an artist then associated with the Nika (Second Section Society) and later joined Kyūshū-ha. In January 1958, Tabe officially left Iwataya and got married in March to Kenji Tabe.

=== Works during Kyūshū-ha (1957–1968) ===
In March 1957, Mitsuko Tabe joined the Kyūshū-ha soon after its founding and remained a core member through its dissolution in 1968. Tabe served as treasurer and participated in all of the Kyushu-ha exhibitions in Tokyo and Fukuoka. As one of the few female members, Tabe brought a feminist viewpoint to the group.

==== Anger of Fishes (Gyozoku no Ikari, 魚族の怒り) (1957) ====
Beginning in 1957, Tabe created multiple marine-themed paintings, including Fish 1 & 2 (Gyozoku 1 & 2, 1957), Conversation by the Sea 1 & 2 (Umi de no hanashi 1 & 2, 1957), and the best known one, Anger of Fishes (Gyozoku no Ikari, 1957). Detailing her interest in this subject matter, Tabe said:

I've made fish a theme of mine. It's something that started when I began to feel a fascination with a biology, an ecology, other than the human one. The forms of fish and shells, when you really concentrate on them, don't make any single stable form. In their wet sliminess we can receive and feel them in any way we choose. They're also full of irony and humor. My aim is to capture what is so hard to capture, swimming around freely.

In making these paintings, Tabe sought to explore the fecundity of nonhuman ecology and attempted to visualize the motion and even unpredictability of marine lives. Employing asphalt and oil paint to create thick texture — a signature style of Kyūshū-ha members’ work — Tabe staged an energized blast of abstracted shapes and colors to represent the presumed emotion of the fish. Clumps of hexagonal grid lines explode from the center resemble schools of angered, recalcitrant fish, seemingly crushed by a great force from above. With the rusting red, the rough surface exhibit sandstone-like quality. Tabe also used cross-sections of a bamboo broom handle to make rings and stuck them to the canvas with tar. The use of both industrial and organic materials reflects Tabe's environmentalist concern, making the painting an early example of the artist’s social consciousness. Anger of Fishes won the Asahi Silver Prize at the 3rd Western Women's Art Exhibition (1959) and the Gold Prize at the 3rd Western Japan Western-style Painting Newcomer's Excellence Exhibition (1960), and was exhibited in the 2nd Kyushu Independent Exhibition organized by the Nishinippon Shimbun.

==== Propagating (Hanshoku suru, 繁殖する, 1958/1988) ====
The theme of procreation and swarm was carried over to the Propagating (Hanshoku suru, 1958/1988), series that reportedly consists of four paintings, all created in 1958. The tar-coated bamboo rings have taken much stronger presence now as to form the central figures. The groupings of the rings characterize various formations of lives, human or nonhuman. Other artists in Kyūshū-ha, such as Taniguchi Toshio and Nakanishi Natsuyuki, also explored the subject of propagation. While having not been explicitly stated, the Propagating series can also be read in the framework of the female, mirroring Tabe’s later investigation of women as child-bearers.

In September 1961, two of Mitsuko Tabe’s works, the Placards (1961) and Artificial Placenta (1961), were exhibited at the 3rd Kyūshū-ha Exhibition at Ginza Gallery, Tokyo.

==== Placards series (Purakādo, プラカード, 1961) ====
Tabe sourced magazine cutouts and kiss-shaped stamps and used resin to produce these collages. The magazine cutouts contain images of American popular culture, especially those of African American jazz musicians and soldiers at war. Three of the five Placards feature a representation of the African continents, and two of them also had strands of reddish hemp palm fiber pasted onto the collages, pointing at the blood shed in acquiring freedom. The images and the map loosely point to the civil rights movement in the United States and perhaps the independences of African nations. The other two of the series placed the American flag, torn and reshaped, as the central element, and one of the two shows barbed wire and enlarged, drawn by the artist, which possibly references the Vietnam War. Culling visual materials from news and popular culture, Tabe sought to create placards that are more powerful than the ones with only texts.

==== Artificial Placenta (Jinkō taipan, 人工胎盤, 1961) ====
Created while Tabe was pregnant with her first son, Artificial Placenta was a mixed-media installation based on the notion that “the true liberation of women is only possible if they are liberated from pregnancy.” The installation consists of the hip portion of three mannequins and the torso portions of two child mannequins. The hip sections, covered by cotton, cloth, and scattered nails, were placed upside down on pedestals against a wall. With an opening in the center that resembles the exposure of the uterus, each hip section had a vacuum tube inserted into the reproductive organ. The artist also used ping-pong balls to outline the opening. Above the hip sections, the child torso sections were hung horizontally on the same wall. The installation exposed the pain of the female body during childbearing in an aggressive manner, resonating with the notion that considers women as childbearing machines. The exhibition was attended by many members of the Neo Dada artists and art critics. The predominant male audiences predictably overlooked Tabe's ideological message in this installation. It was also scandalously featured in the October 20th issue of the popular weekly magazine "Doyo Manga” (土曜漫画) under the headline "Artists Who Dwell on Female Genitalia.” Meanwhile, Artificial Placenta did not resonate with the female audience at the time of its release. Tabe said, “[Ideas of] women’s revolution, feminism, and gender did not yet enter Japan, so there was no response from women even though I was making an important statement.

The original work has not been extant and the artist recreated a version, one without the child mannequins, for an exhibition at the Contemporary Art Museum, Kumamoto in 2004. The recent exhibition of the work had prompted viewers to recognize Tabe as an early feminist.

==== Great Meeting of Heroes (Eiyū-tachi no dai shūkai, 英雄たちの大集会, 1962) ====
At the "Great Meeting of Heroes" event held at Fukuoka's Momochi Beach in November 1962, Tabe attempted to hammer nails into the lower half of a mannequin, but it took more force than expected, so she had a male artist hammer them in for her. As with “Artificial Placenta,” this is also considered to be an act of rejecting the female gender. She also created a space lined with the legs of mannequins wearing stockings, which was described by critic Yoshida Yoshie as “a cathedral of nymphomaniac rituals unique to the Kyūshū-ha’s women's group.”

==== Sex Museum (Sekkusu Hakubutsukan, セックス博物館, 1968) ====
Sex Museum was a project Tabe contributed to in May 1968, and it was exhibited at “The Possibility of Art through Group Union” exhibition at Fukuoka Prefectural Cultural Hall, often regarded as the last group exhibition of Kyūshū-ha. The idea of the work was proposed by Obata Hideshi. Tabe exhibited a pair of works as part of the Sex Museum. One depicted a kokeshi doll in the shape of a man's genitalia and the other one was made of a large mirror, where the lower half of a naked man and woman embracing each other as well as a woman milking with a huge bottle of milk. Moreover, she also exhibited a work that showed a gourd with a rubber navel, resembling “unborn feces,” and the object was put in a rainbow-colored washing machine and stirred around. There was also a performance component, when Tabe continuously sewed a long string that resembled male genitalia. Albeit titled Sex Museum, Tabe’s contributions focused on reproduction and less so on the sexual intercourse itself. In other words, she presents not the pleasurable aspect of sex, but the consequent aspects of pregnancy, childbirth, and breastfeeding, which are owed only to women. By stepping on a sewing machine, she refers to women's economic power, and by the gourd in the washing machine, she refers to lives aborted for economic reasons. The expression of a radical awareness of the problems of sex from the women’s side served as the fundamental characteristic of Tabe's artistic concerns.

=== Works in and after the 1970s ===
After Kyūshū-ha dissolved in 1968, Tabe continued to create works independently and advocate for women artists. Throughout the 1960s and 1970s, she taught painting classes at home while raising her children, and participated in the annual Trends in Contemporary Art in Kyushu (九州・現代美術の動向) exhibition since 1967. In the 1969 exhibition, she participated in a parade, carrying a doll on her back as she walked through the city, trying to demonstrate the hardships housewives faced in raising their children. Between 1974 and 1984, Tabe organized the annual Kyūshū Women Artists Exhibition.

In the 1980s, likely having learned about mail art, Tabe headed the Earth Art Post Office, which invited people from all over the world to send their artworks by mail. She organized exhibitions of works sent to her.

In 1988 at the age of 55, Tabe declared herself “retired from housewife-hood” and concentrated on her artist career. In the 1990s, Tabe further expanded her diverse body of work to include a series of collages focusing on apples, which became her main motif for many years. Her works from the 1990s showcased frequent usage of gold leaf as the background of her collages. Since 1994, Tabe has exhibited worldwide, including New York, Washington D.C., and Paris.

Between 1995 and 2010, she served as the first president of the Fukuoka City Art Association. Since 2002, she has also collaborated with American jazz keyboardist Bob James. In 2015, she established the "3-Chome Art School" in Tenjin, Fukuoka City, under the title of “the world's smallest art school.”

== Other notable artworks ==
The Right and Wrong Sides (1963)
Aa! Terayama Shuji (1966)
Mitsuko Tabe’s Happening (1967), taken place at SNACK BOBO, Fukuoka
Sign Language (1996-2010)
Apple Series
I Love the Earth

== Exhibitions and awards ==
1953 The 13th Prefectural Exhibition, Fukuoka
1960 Gold Award at the 3rd West Japan Western Painting Exhibition
1960-63 Yomiuri Independent Exhibition
1964 Solo exhibition, Tokyo
1971 The 5th Kyushu Contemporary Art Trend Exhibition, Fukuoka Prefectural Culture Hall
1972–73 Will to Possibility, Kitakyushu Municipal Museum of Art, Yawata
1974 Illusion and Emotion, Fukuoka Prefectural Cultural Hall, Fukuoka
1974–84 Kyushu Women Painters Exhibition (organizer)
1976, 1978 Solo exhibition, Toa Gallery, Muraokaya & Fukuoka Prefectural Cultural Hall
1978 Amigo Exhibition — Toshiko Hirayama, Aiko Oguro, Mitsuko Tabe, Art Stage, Fukuoka
1978 10th Today’s Art Exhibition, Fukuoka Prefectural Cultural Hall
1981, 1983, 1990 Earth Art Post Office Exhibitions
1981, 1983 Solo exhibitions, Fukuoka
1982 Kyushu Women Painters Special Exhibition, Fukuoka Prefectural Cultural Hall
1984 Eight Women Artists Exhibition, Gallery DON, Fukuoka
1987 '87 Kyushu Contemporary Art - Transformation of Creation, Fukuoka Prefectural Art Museum
1988 Kyushu-ha Exhibition: Anti-Art Project, Fukuoka Art Museum
1988 Asia International Art Exhibition, Fukuoka Art Museum
1988–90 Solo exhibitions
1990 World Mail · Art Exhibition, Gallery Gaya, Fukuoka
1992–93 Solo exhibition, Makigami Gallery, Tokyo
1993 Fukuoka Nichido Gallery, Tokyo
1993 Contemporary Art of Kyushu 93’: the Rebirth of Image Exhibition, Fukuoka
1994–95 Solo exhibition, Cast Iron Gallery, New York
1995 Contemporary Art Techniques / Collage Exhibition, Nerima Ward Museum of Art, Tokyo
1998 Exhibition, Gallery Okuda International, Washington, D.C.
1999 Exhibition, Adirondack Community College, New York
2000 Fukuoka City Culture Award; Solo Exhibition, Kurokawa INN Art Museum, Fukuoka; 7th Fukuoka City Art Federation Exhibition, Fukuoka City Art Museum
2002 Mitsuko Tabe: Recent Works, Gallery Toile, Fukuoka
2003 Kyushu Power, Contemporary Art Museum, Kumamoto
2003–04 Solo exhibition, Gallery 58
2005 Apple’s Secret, Hiroshima Museum of Art
2005 Japanese Women Artists in Avant-Garde Movements, 1950-1975, Tochigi Prefectural Museum of Art
2012 Mizoe Gallery, Fukuoka
2013 Mitsuko Tabe: Life is Art, Fukuoka Art Museum
2013 New Works by Mitsuko Tabe, Mizoe Art Gallery, Fukuoka
2015 Exhibition of 100 Works by Mitsuko Tabe and the Best Artists of Kyushu, Y Art Gallery, Osaka
2015 Kyushu-ha Exhibition, Fukuoka Art Museum
2017 Mitsuko Tabe: Evolution is Very Creative, Mizoe Art Gallery, Fukuoka
2022 Mitsuko Tabe Exhibition, Fukuoka Art Museum

== Books ==
The Earth Post Office for Incoming Caller Payment, Ikka Shobo, 1984
The Dream Eater: The World of Michiko Ishimure (co-authored with Nobuko Kono), Fujiwara Shoten, 1992
The Art of Conception, Hana Shoin, 1997
The Apple of Two Thousand Years: My Theory of De-Art, Nishinippon Shimbun, 2001

== Collections ==
Fukuoka Art Museum
Mizoe Art Gallery
Contemporary Art Museum, Kumamoto
SUNY Adirondack
