= Fukui Fine Arts Museum =

- 福井県立美術館
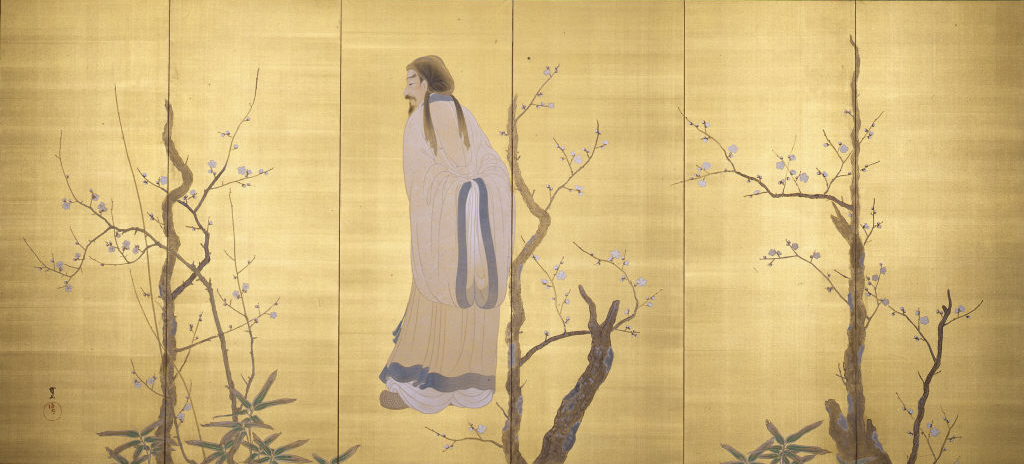
- Celebrating the New Year by Kimura Buzan
- Interactive map of the Fukui Fine Arts Museum area

General information
- Location: 3-16-1 Bunkyō, Fukui, Fukui Prefecture, Japan
- Coordinates: 36°04′43″N 136°12′55″E
- Opened: 1 November 1977

Website
- Official website

Fukui Fine Arts Museum (福井県立美術館, Fukui kenritsu bijutsukan) opened in Fukui, Fukui Prefecture, Japan, in 1977. The collection, numbering some 2,840 pieces, includes prints by Goya and Picasso and paintings by Iwasa Matabei and artists associated with Okakura Tenshin and the beginnings of the Nihon Bijutsuin. The museum played and important role for contemporary artist Ay-O by hosting his first retrospective in 2006.

== See also ==
- Fukui Prefectural Museum of Cultural History
- List of Cultural Properties of Japan - paintings (Fukui)
