= Kehi Shrine =

Shrine in Tsuruga, Fukui Prefecture, Japan

Kehi Shrine 氣比神宮
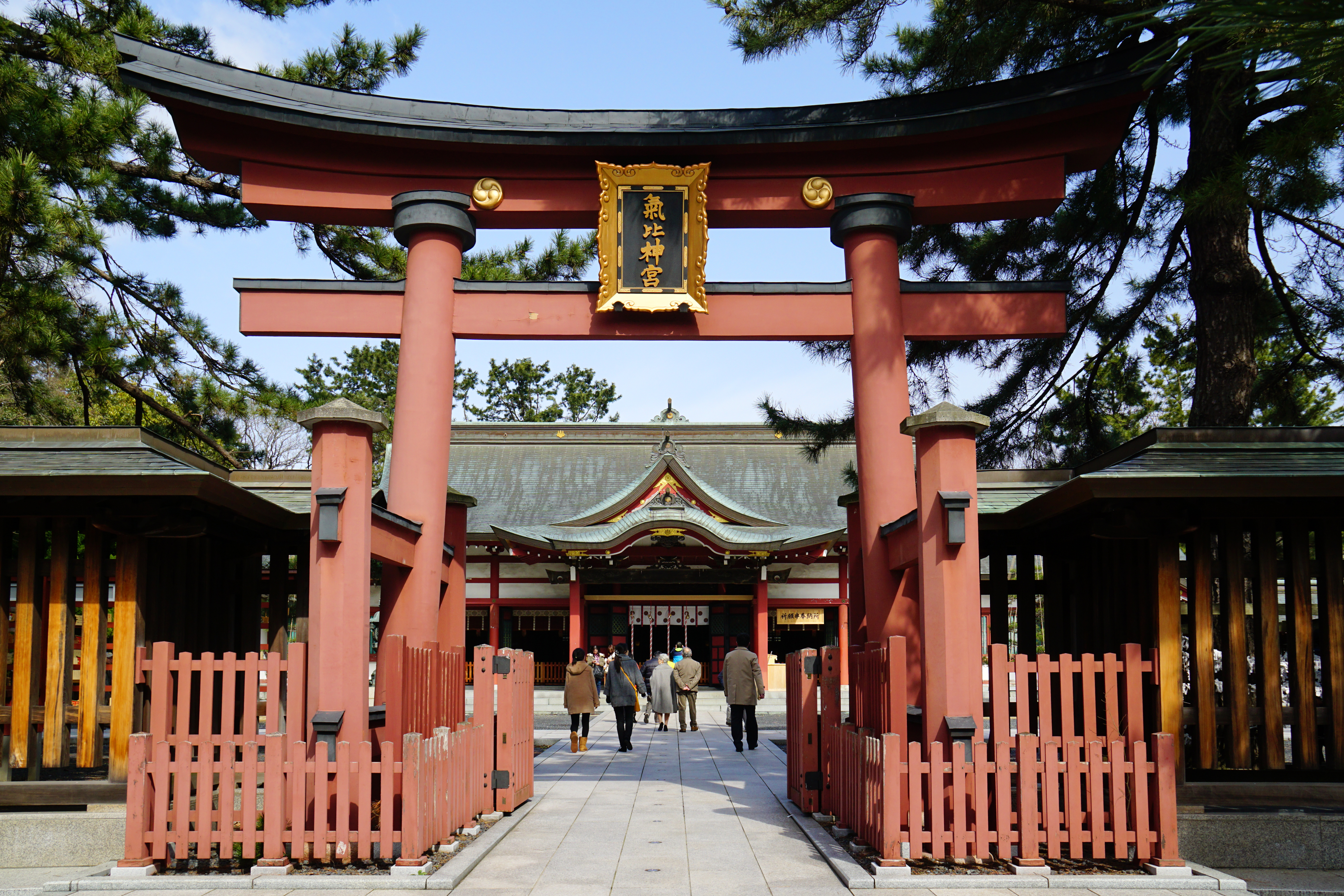
- Nakatorii of Kehi Shrine

- Location within Fukui Prefecture Location within Japan

Religion
- Affiliation: Shinto
- Deity: Izasawake no mikoto
- Festival: Reitaisai (September 4th)

Location
- Location: 11-68 Akebono-chō, Tsuruga-shi, Fukui-ken
- Interactive map of Kehi Shrine 氣比神宮
- Coordinates: 35.6550°N 136.0747°E

Website
- Official website

Kehi Shrine (氣比神宮, Kehi Jingū) is a Shinto shrine located in the Akebono-chō neighborhood of the city of Tsuruga, Fukui Prefecture, Japan. It is the ichinomiya of former Echizen Province. The main festival of the shrine is held annually on September 4. The shrine is considered the chief guardian shrine of the Hokuriku region.

== Enshrined kami ==
The kami enshrined at Kehi Jingū are:

- Izasawake-no-mikoto (伊奢沙別命), the semi-legendary Prince Tsunuga Arashito, who traveled from his home in Silla to Tsuruga during the reign of Emperor Sujin. According to the Nihon Shoki he had horns coming from his head; the area was named “Tsunuga,” written, literally, “horn-deer,” and over time it became “Tsuruga.”
- Emperor Chūai (仲哀天皇, Chūai-tennō), the semi-legendary 14th Emperor of Japan
- Empress Jingū (神功皇后, Jingū-kōgō), consort of Emperor Chūai
- Yamato Takeru (ヤマトタケルノミコト, Yamato Takeru no Mikoto)
- Tama-hime no mikoto (玉姫命), the daughter of Empress Jingū
- Emperor Ōjin (応神天皇, Ōjin-tennō), the 15th Emperor of Japan
- Takenouchi no Sukune (武内宿禰), legendary hero-statesman

== History ==
The Kehi Jingū is located in the northeastern part of Tsuruga city in the central part of Fukui prefecture. Tsuruga has a good natural port, and was the gateway between the Kinai region and the Korean Peninsula and Asian continent since ancient times. Because of its location, the shine was given particular importance by the imperial court, and is mentioned frequently in ancient chronicles such as the "Kojiki" and "Nihon Shoki", especially in connection to events connected with the semi-legendary Emperor Chūai, Empress Jingū, and Emperor Ōjin and the Japanese conquest of the Three Kingdoms of Korea. The actual foundation of the shrine predates written history, and its first mention in national chronicles is from around 692 AD during the reign of Empress Jito. During the Heian period, imperial messengers were frequently dispatched to the shrine, and its ranking within the court hierarchy steadily rose, as described in the Shoku Nihon Kōki, Nihon Montoku Tennō Jitsuroku, Nihon Kiryaku and other historical sources. In the 927 Engishiki, it is listed as a myōjin taisha and by the end of the Heian period was the ichinomiya of the province. In the Heian and Kamakura period, the shrine commanded vast estates extending from Echizen to Echigo and Sado Province. The shrine sided with the Southern Court in the Nanboku-chō period, and even after defeat by the Northern Court, still commanded territory with a kokudaka of 240,000 koku. The shrine supported the Asakura clan during the Sengoku period and was thus largely destroyed by the forces of Oda Nobunaga. In the early Edo Period, the shrine's restored with a very modest 100 koku by Yūki Hideyasu in 1604. It also received donation from Tokugawa Iemitsu and by the various daimyō of Ōno Domain, but never regained its former prosperity. In September of 1689, Kehi Jingu Shrine was visited by the famous poet Matsuo Basho, and his visit is still commemorated with a statue and a stone monument inscribed with his haiku.

During the Meiji period era of State Shinto, the shrine was rated as aImperial shrine, 1st rank (官幣大社, Kanpei Taisha) under the Modern system of ranked Shinto Shrines

The shrine was mostly destroyed in 1945, during the Bombing of Tsuruga in World War II by American forces, and its National Treasure Honden built in the Edo period by Yūki Hideyasu burned down. One surviving structure is the shrine's 11-meter-tall torii gate, which was built in 1902 and which is registered as a National [Important Cultural Property. It is the third largest wooden torii gate in Japan, alongside Nara’s Kasuga Taisha Shrine and Hiroshima’s Itsukushima Shrine.

The shrine is located a 15-minute walk from Tsuruga Stationon the JR West Hokuriku Main Line.

== Gallery ==
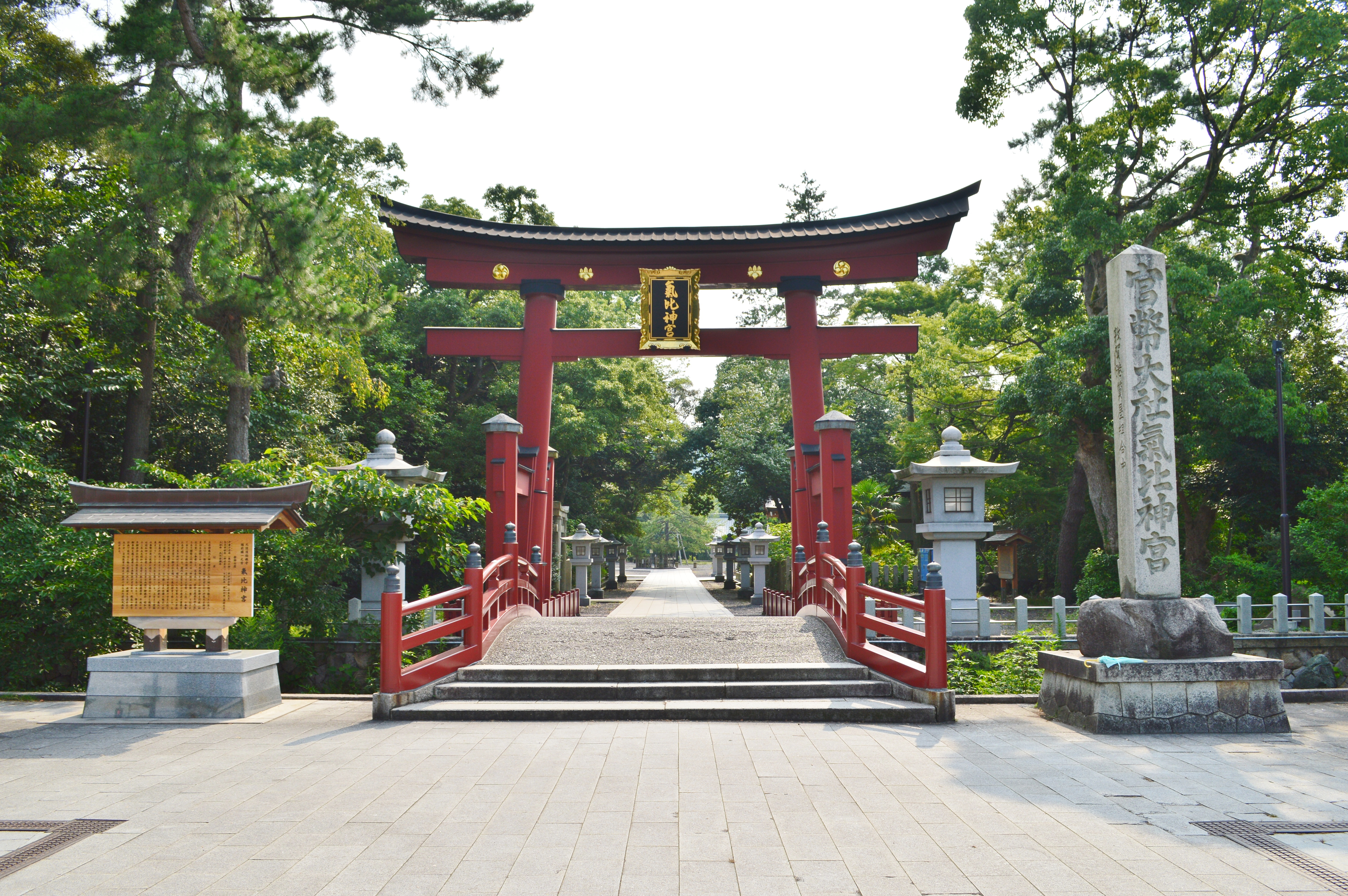
Ōtorii (ICP)

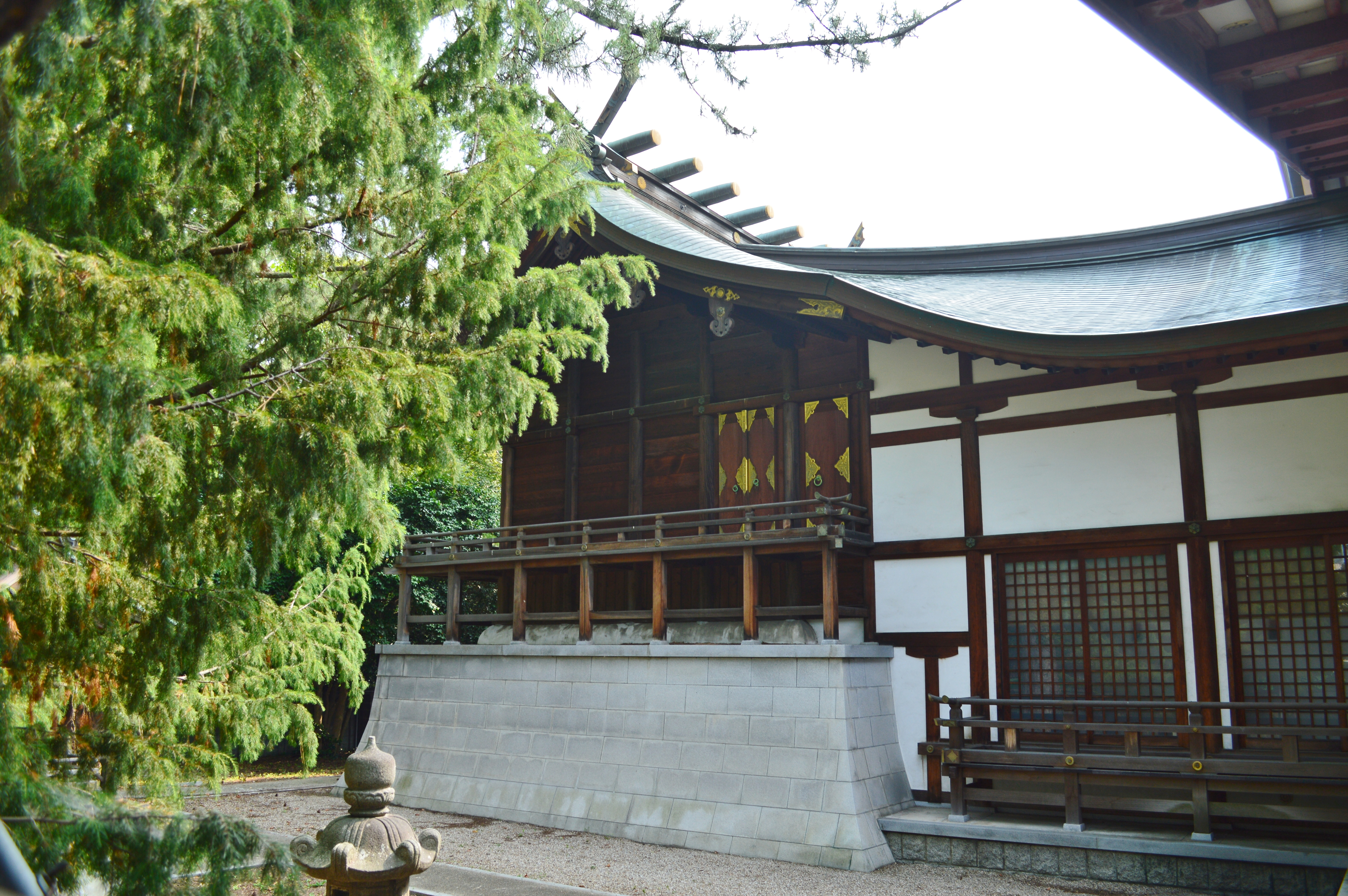
Honden

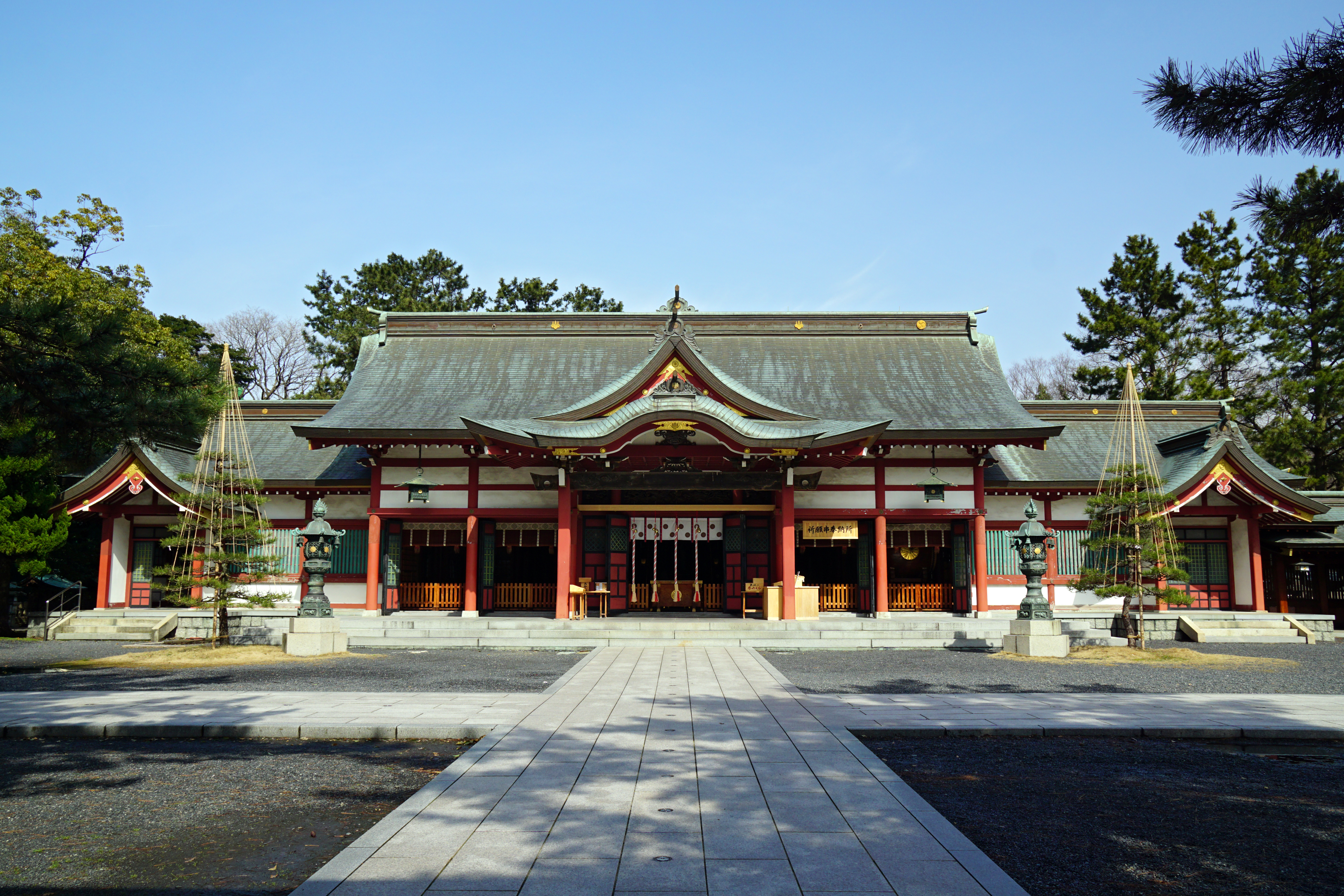
Outer Haiden

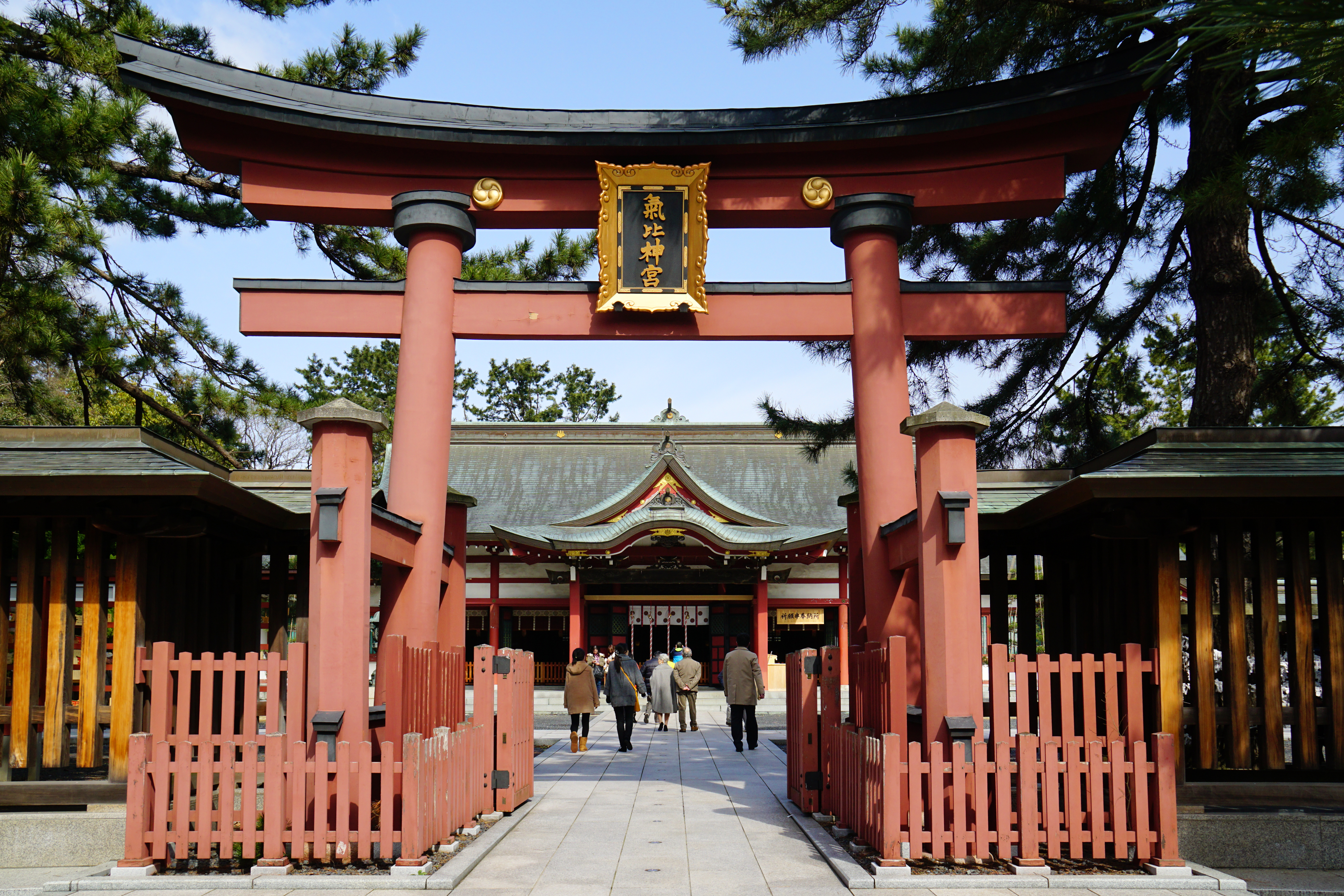
Middle Torii and Outer Haiden

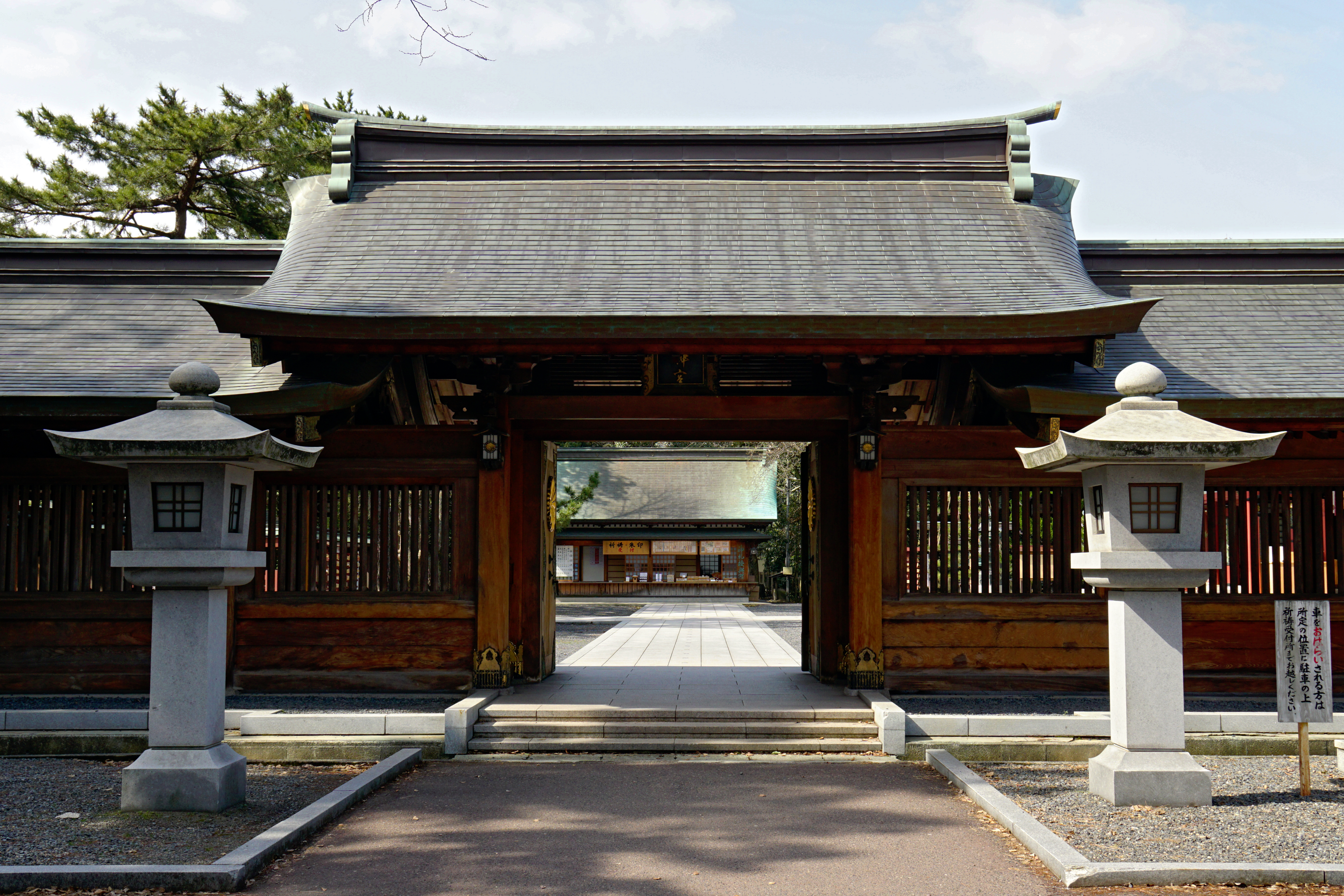
Gate

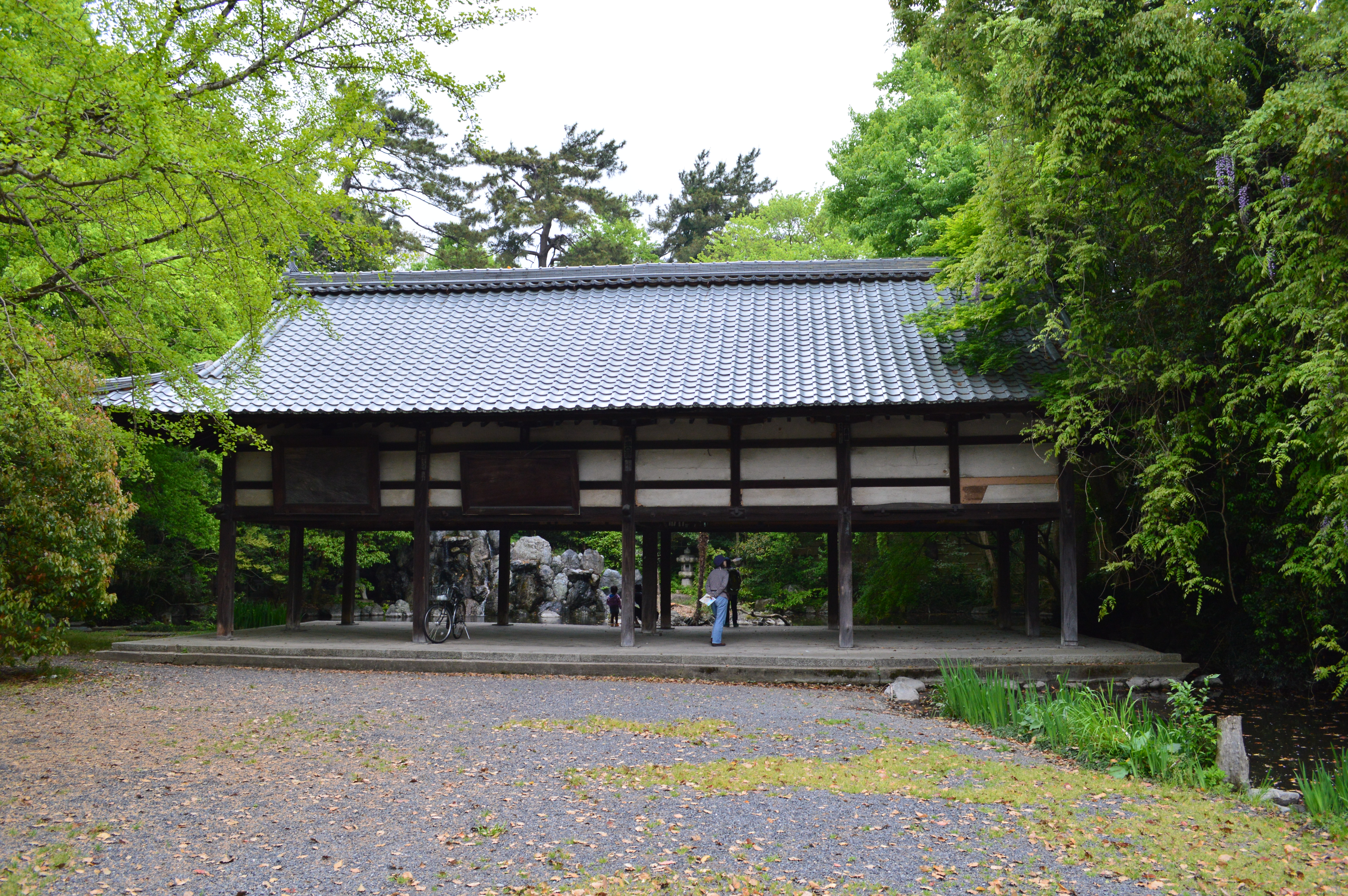
Ema Hall

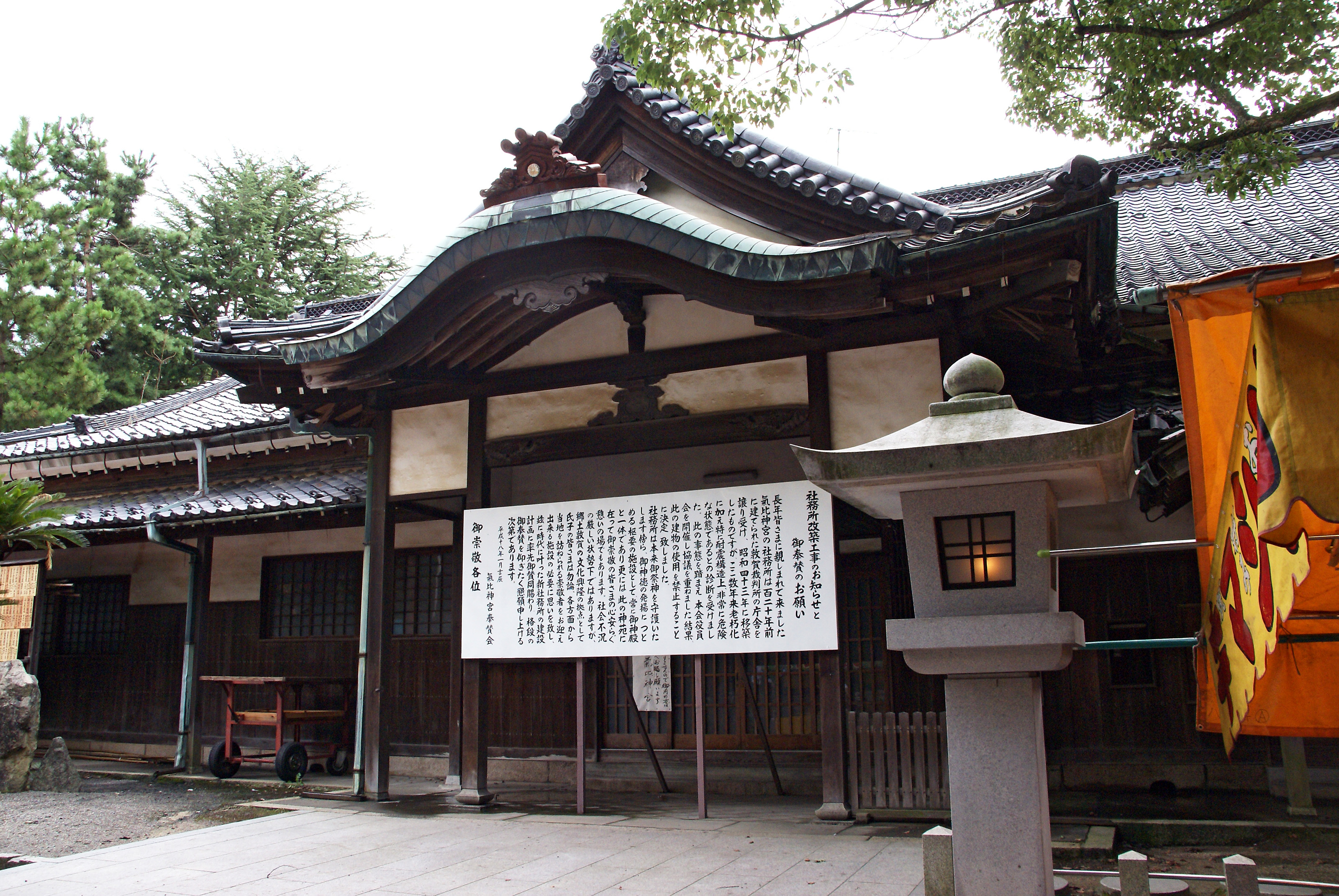
former shrine offices

Front view of the Ōtorii (great torii) of Kehi Jingū in snow, Tsuruga

== Cultural Properties ==
=== National Important Cultural Properties ===
- Kehi Jingū Ōtorii (気比神宮大鳥居), Edo Period (1645), wooden, painted vermillion. This torii gate has a height of 10.93 meters. The inscription is by Prince Arisugawa Takehito.

=== National Places of Scenic Beauty ===
- Kei no Myōjin (けいの明神（氣比神宮境内), as part of the Landscapes of the Oku-no-hosomichi (おくのほそ道の風景地; Oku no Hosomichi no fūkei-chi), which spans 26 locations in .

== See also ==
- List of Jingu
- Ichinomiya
- List of Places of Scenic Beauty of Japan (Fukui)
