= List of places of scenic beauty of Japan (Fukui) =

This list is of the places of scenic beauty of Japan located within the Prefecture of Fukui.

== National Places of Scenic Beauty ==
As of 1 January 2021, sixteen Places have been designated at a national level (including one *Special Place of Scenic Beauty).

| Site | Municipality | Comments | Image | Coordinates | Type | Ref. |
|---|---|---|---|---|---|---|
| *Ichijōdani Asakura Family Gardens 一乗谷朝倉氏庭園; Ichijõ-dani Asakura-shi teien | Fukui | | | 35°59′42″N 136°17′28″E | 1 | |
| Itō Family Gardens 伊藤氏庭園; Itō-shi teien | Minamiechizen | | | 35°47′51″N 136°17′57″E | 1 | |
| Kehi no Matsubara 気比の松原; Kehi-no-matsubara | Tsuruga | | | 35°39′16″N 136°02′56″E | 3, 8 | |
| Former Genshō-in Gardens 旧玄成院庭園; Kyū-Genshō-in teien | Katsuyama | | | 36°02′40″N 136°32′17″E | 1 | |
| Mikata Five Lakes 三方五湖; Mikata go-ko | Wakasa/Mihama | | | 35°35′26″N 135°52′22″E | 7, 8 | |
| Shibata Family Gardens 柴田氏庭園; Shibata-shi teien | Tsuruga | | | 35°37′44″N 136°03′00″E | 1 | |
| Sotomo 若狭蘇洞門; Wakasa Sotomo | Obama | | | 35°33′59″N 135°42′41″E | 5, 8 | |
| Jōfuku-ji Gardens 城福寺庭園; Jōfukuji teien | Echizen | | | 35°53′32″N 136°13′51″E | 1 | |
| Saifuku-ji Shoin Gardens 西福寺書院庭園; Saifukuji shoin teien | Tsuruga | | | 35°39′25″N 136°01′54″E | 1 | |
| Takidan-ji Gardens 滝谷寺庭園; Takidanji teien | Sakai | | | 36°13′20″N 136°08′46″E | 1 | |
| Tōjinbō 東尋坊; Tōjinbō | Sakai | also a Natural Monument | | 36°15′05″N 136°07′13″E | 5, 8 | |
| Umeda Family Gardens 梅田氏庭園; Umeda-shi teien | Ikeda | | | 35°54′14″N 136°21′28″E | 1 | |
| Yōkōkan Gardens 養浩館（旧御泉水屋敷）庭園; Yōkōkan (kyū-Osensui yashiki) teien | Fukui | | | 36°04′06″N 136°13′27″E | 1 | |
| Mantoku-ji Gardens 萬徳寺庭園; Mantokuji teien | Obama | | | 35°28′08″N 135°47′06″E | 1 | |
| Mitamura Family Gardens 三田村氏庭園; Mitamura-shi teien | Echizen | | | 35°54′13″N 136°10′09″E | 1 | |
| Landscape of Oku no Hosomichi おくのほそ道の風景地; Oku no Hosomichi no fūkei-chi | Tsuruga | designation spans twelve prefectures, including one component property in Fukui: Kei no Myōjin (Kehi Jingū Precinct) (けいの明神（氣比神宮境内）) | | 35°39′18″N 136°04′29″E | | |

== Prefectural Places of Scenic Beauty ==
As of 1 May 2020, seven Places have been designated at a prefectural level.

| Site | Municipality | Comments | Image | Coordinates | Type | Ref. |
|---|---|---|---|---|---|---|
| Imadobana 今戸鼻; Imadobana | Takahama | | | 35°33′05″N 135°30′58″E | | |
| Miko Cherry Blossom 神子の桜; Miko-no-sakura | Wakasa | | | 35°37′18″N 135°50′20″E | | |
| Tokimizu 時水; Tokimizu | Echizen | | | 35°52′38″N 136°15′55″E | | |
| Enshõ-ji Gardens 円照寺庭園; Enshõji teien | Obama | | | 35°28′12″N 135°44′29″E | | |
| Nansen-ji Gardens 南専寺庭園; Nansenji teien | Ōno | | | 35°58′42″N 136°33′26″E | | |
| Ryūsen-ji Gardens 龍泉寺庭園; Ryūsenji teien | Obama | designation comprises two components: the Hondõ West Garden (本堂西庭) and Kuri North Garden (庫裡北庭) | | 35°30′00″N 135°49′22″E | | |
| Hirano Family Gardens 平野氏庭園; Hirano-shi teien | Katsuyama | | | 36°05′N 136°31′E | | |

== Municipal Places of Scenic Beauty ==
As of 1 May 2020, thirty-three Places have been designated at a municipal level.

== Registered Places of Scenic Beauty ==
As of 1 January 2021, two Monuments have been registered (as opposed to designated) as Places of Scenic Beauty at a national level.

| Place | Municipality | Comments | Image | Coordinates | Type | Ref. |
|---|---|---|---|---|---|---|
| Kakyõ Park 花筐公園; Kakyõ kõen | Echizen | | | 35°55′10″N 136°14′15″E | | |
| Tsubokawa Family Gardens 坪川氏庭園; Tsubokawa-shi teien | Sakai | | | 36°09′16″N 136°20′07″E | | |

== See also ==
- Cultural Properties of Japan
- List of parks and gardens of Fukui Prefecture
- List of Historic Sites of Japan (Fukui)
