= Takidan-ji =

Buddhist temple in Sakai, Fukui, Japan

- 瀧谷寺
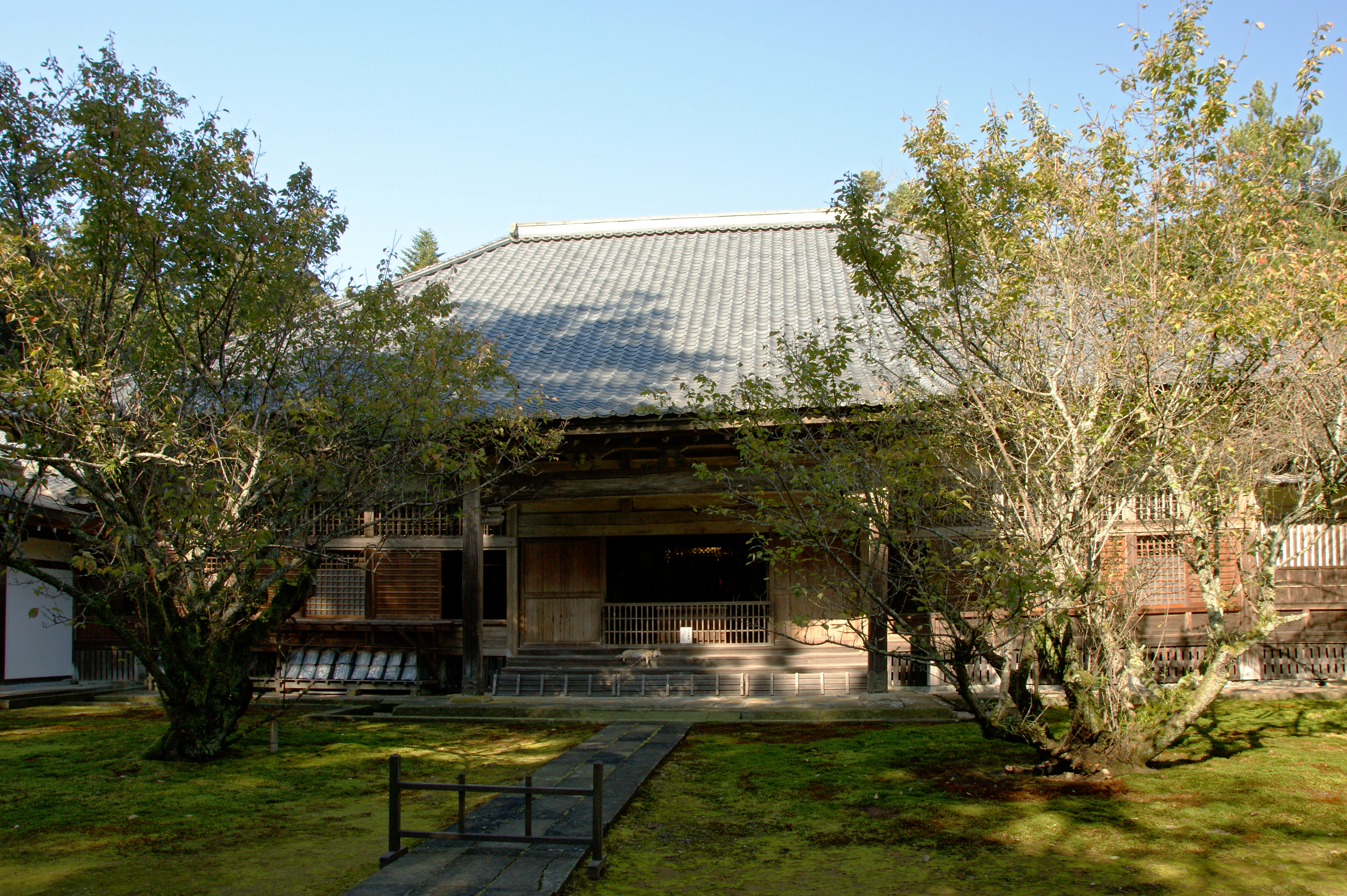
- Takidan-ji main hall

- Takidan-ji Takidan-ji (Japan)

Religion
- Affiliation: Buddhism
- Deity: Yakushi Nyōrai
- Rite: Shingon-shū Chizan-ha sect

Location
- Location: 1-7-15 Mikuni-cho Takidan, Sakai-shi, Fukui-ken
- Country: Japan
- Coordinates: 36°13′18.8″N 136°8′46.0″E

Architecture
- Completed: 1377 AD

Website
- www.takidanji.or.jp
- National Treasure National Important Cultural Property National Place of Scenic Beauty

Takidan-ji (瀧谷寺) is a Buddhist temple located in the city of Sakai, Fukui, Japan, in the Hokuriku region of Japan. It belongs to the Shingon-shū Chizan-ha sectIts main image is a statue of Yakushi Nyōrai, which the temple claims was carved by the Nara period shugendō monk Taichō. The temple is noted for its Japanese garden, which has been designated as a National Place of Scenic Beauty.

== History ==
Takidan-ji was founded in 1377 AD and moved to its present location in 1381. During the Muromachi period it was patronized by the Asakura clan and during the Sengoku period by Shibata Katsuie. Under the Edo period Tokugawa shogunate, it was patronized by the Matsudaira clan, daimyō of Fukui Domain and had many sub-temples. Following the Meiji restoration, the temple became much reduced in scale. Many of its surviving structures date from the Edo period, and are National Important Cultural Properties.

The temple is located a ten minute walk from Mikuni Station on the Echizen Railway Mikuni Awara Line.

== Cultural Properties ==
=== National Treasure ===
- Bianqing (金銅宝相華文磬), Heian period, gilt bronze Buddhist ritual gong with hōsōge flower design.

=== National Important Cultural Properties ===
- Hondō (本堂), mid-Edo period, completed in 1688.
- Kannon-dō (観音堂), Muromachi period, reconstructed in 1633.
- Sanmon (山門), mid-Edo period, reconstructed in 1698. It is said to have been donated by Shibata Katsuie.
- Hōjō and Kuri (方丈及び庫裏), mid-Edo period, completed in 1689.
- Chinju-dō (鎮守堂), late Muromachi period, (1467-1572).
- Kaisan-dō (開山堂), late Muromachi period, completed in 1572.
- Scroll: Jizō, Bosatsu (絹本著色地蔵菩薩像); Kamakura period, colored paint on silk
- Scroll: Star Chart (絵画・天之図), mid-Muromachi period,

=== National Place of Scenic Beauty ===
- Takidan-ji gardens (庭園); Edo period; located adjacent to the Hondo
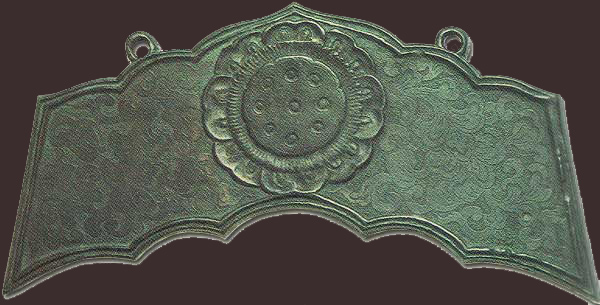
Hosoge flower gong
（NT）

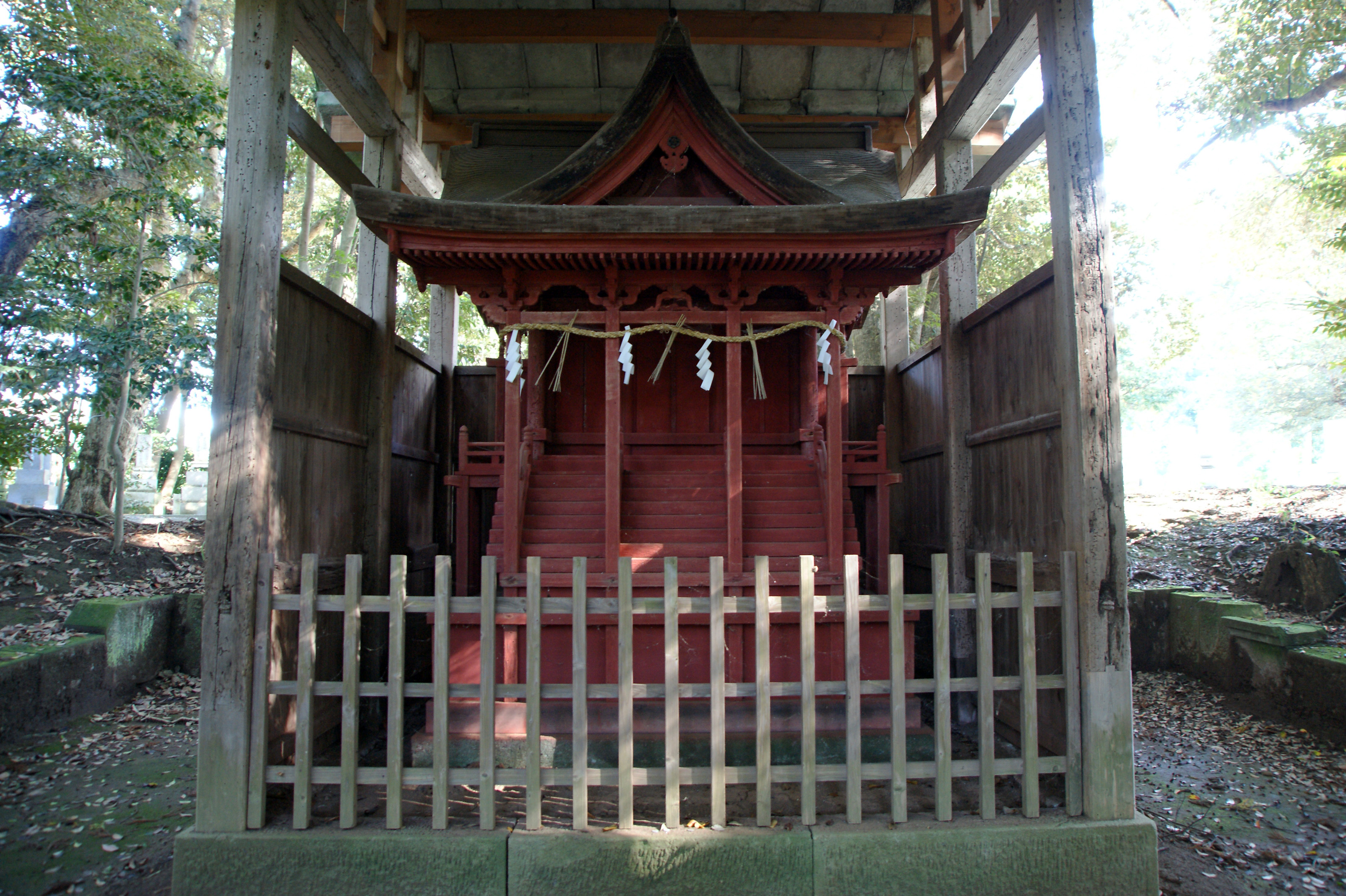
Chinju-dō
（ICP）

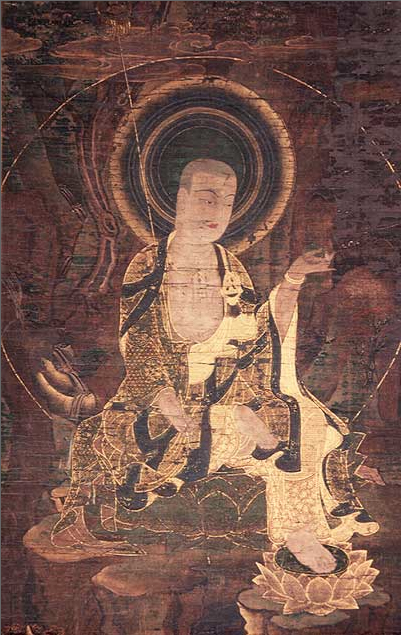
Jizo Bosatsu scroll
（ICP）

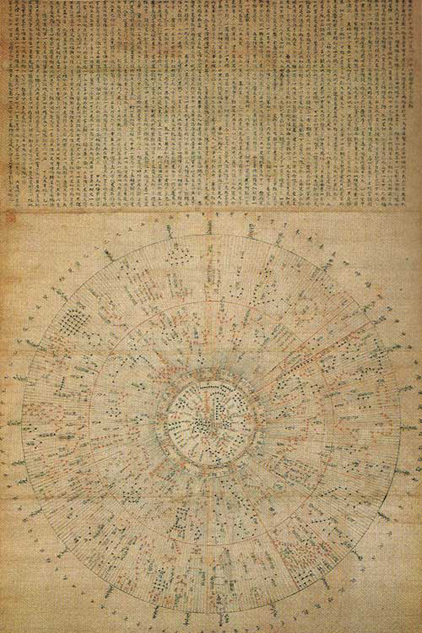
Map of the Heavens
（ICP）

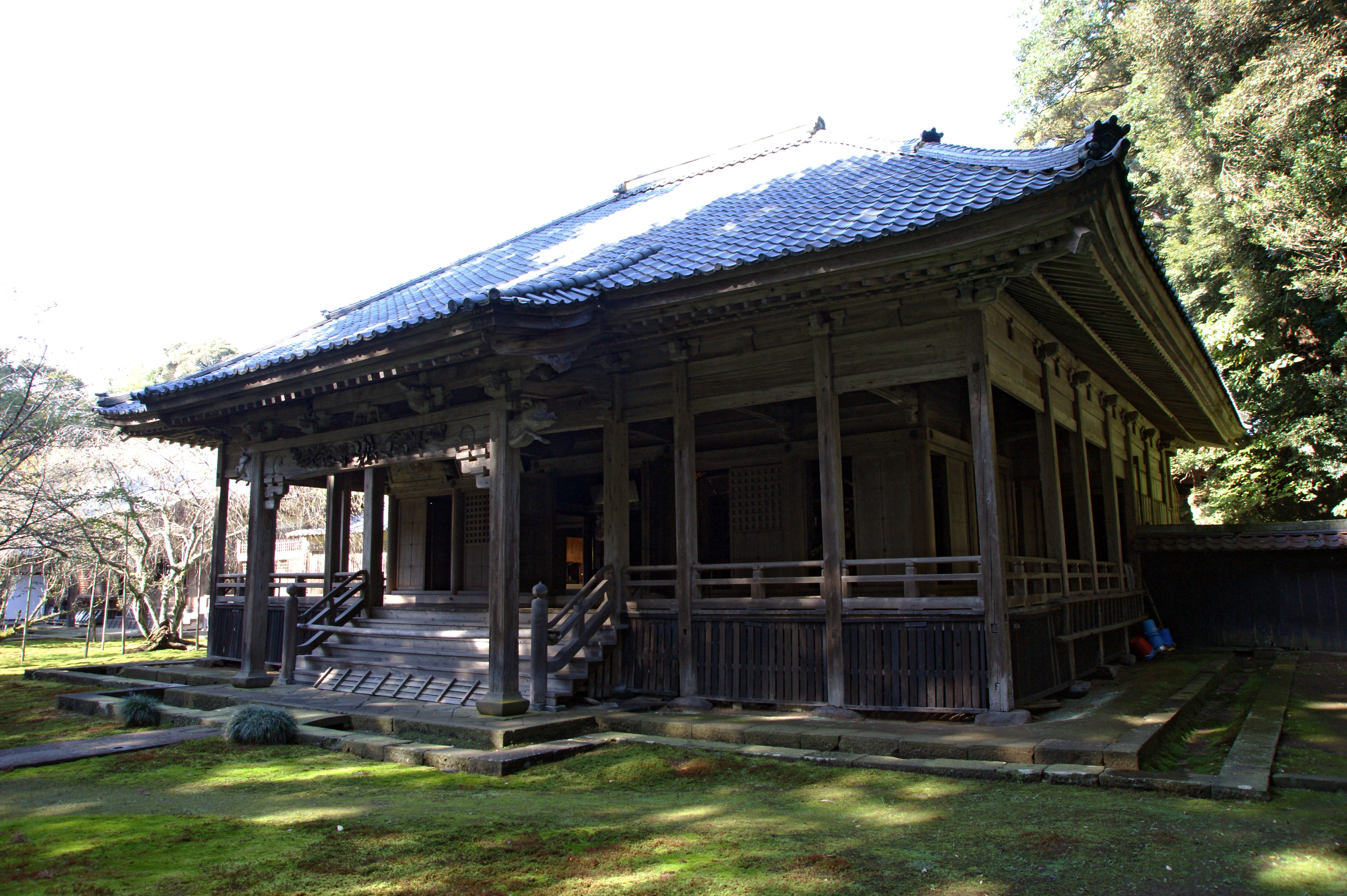
Kannon-dō
（ICP）

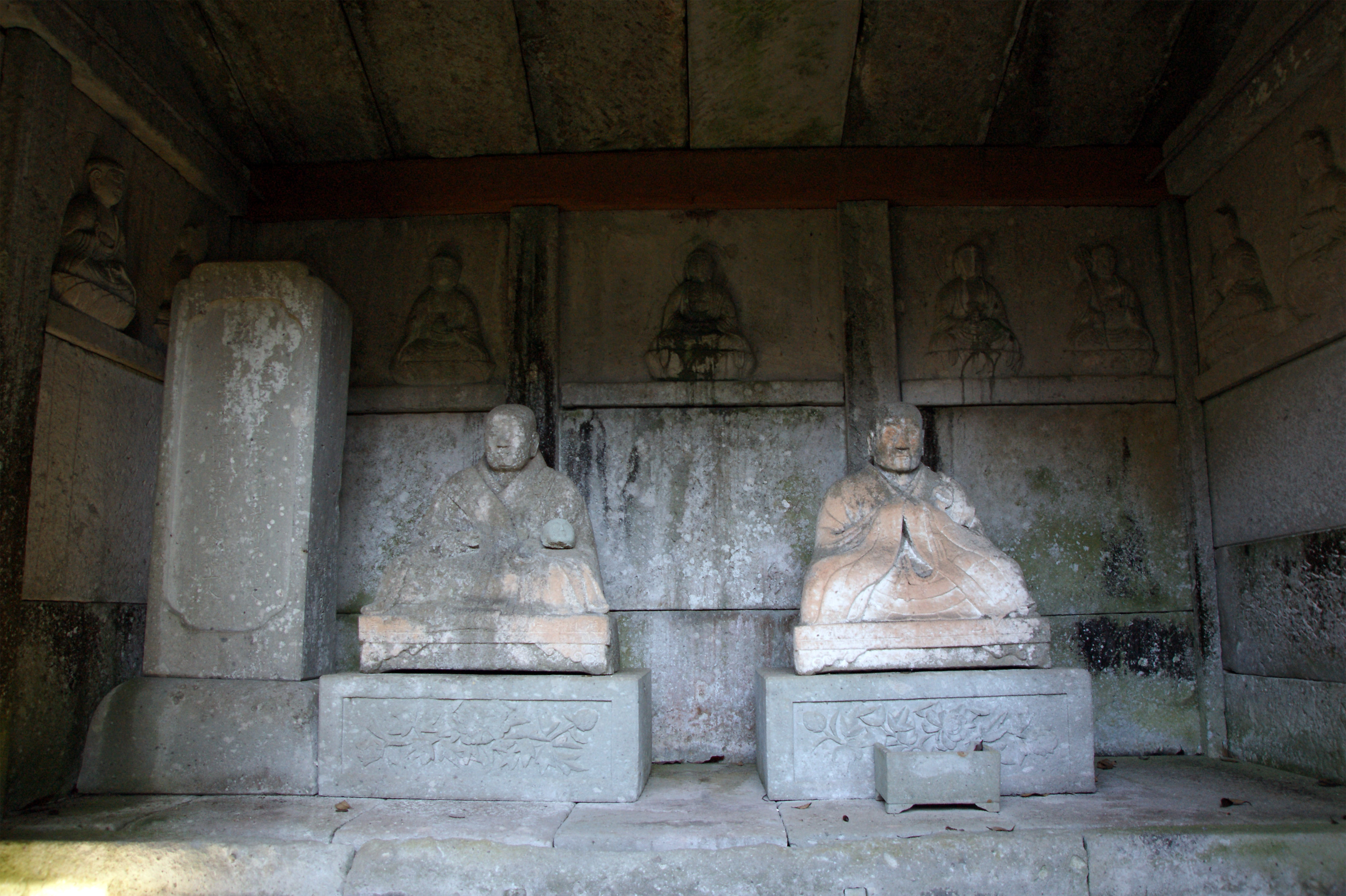
Kaisan-dō
（ICP）

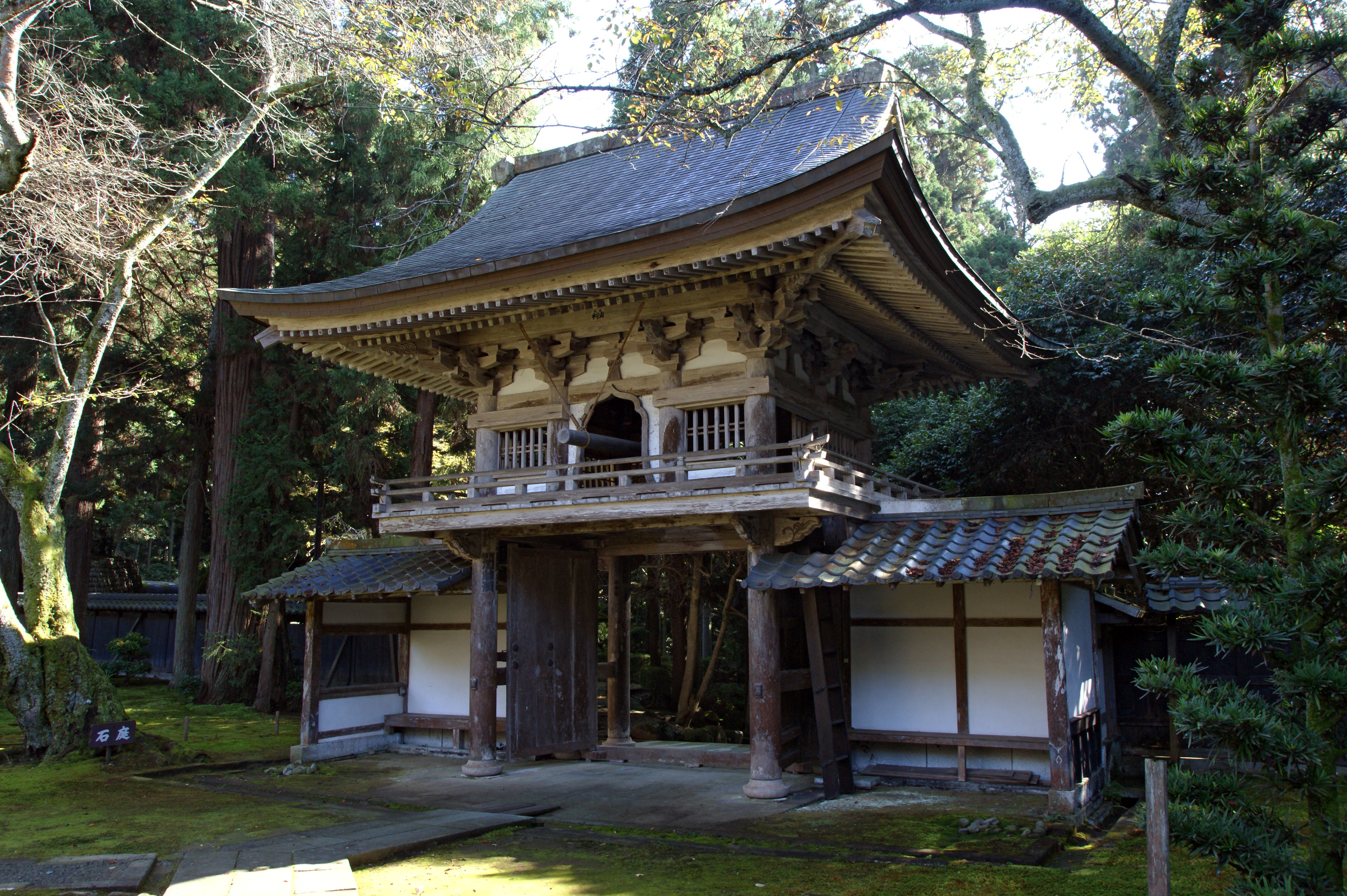
Sanmon
（ICP）
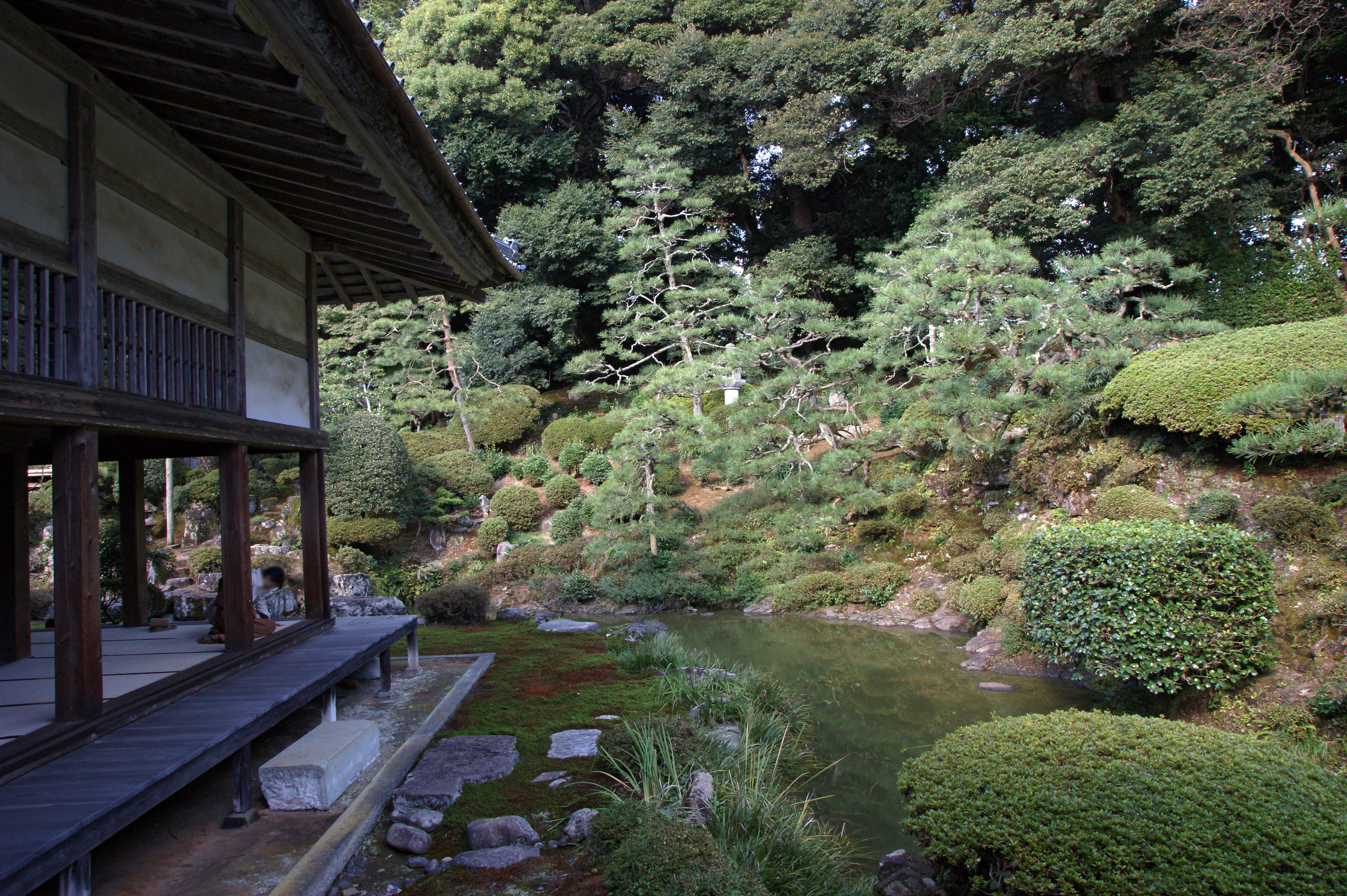
Gardens

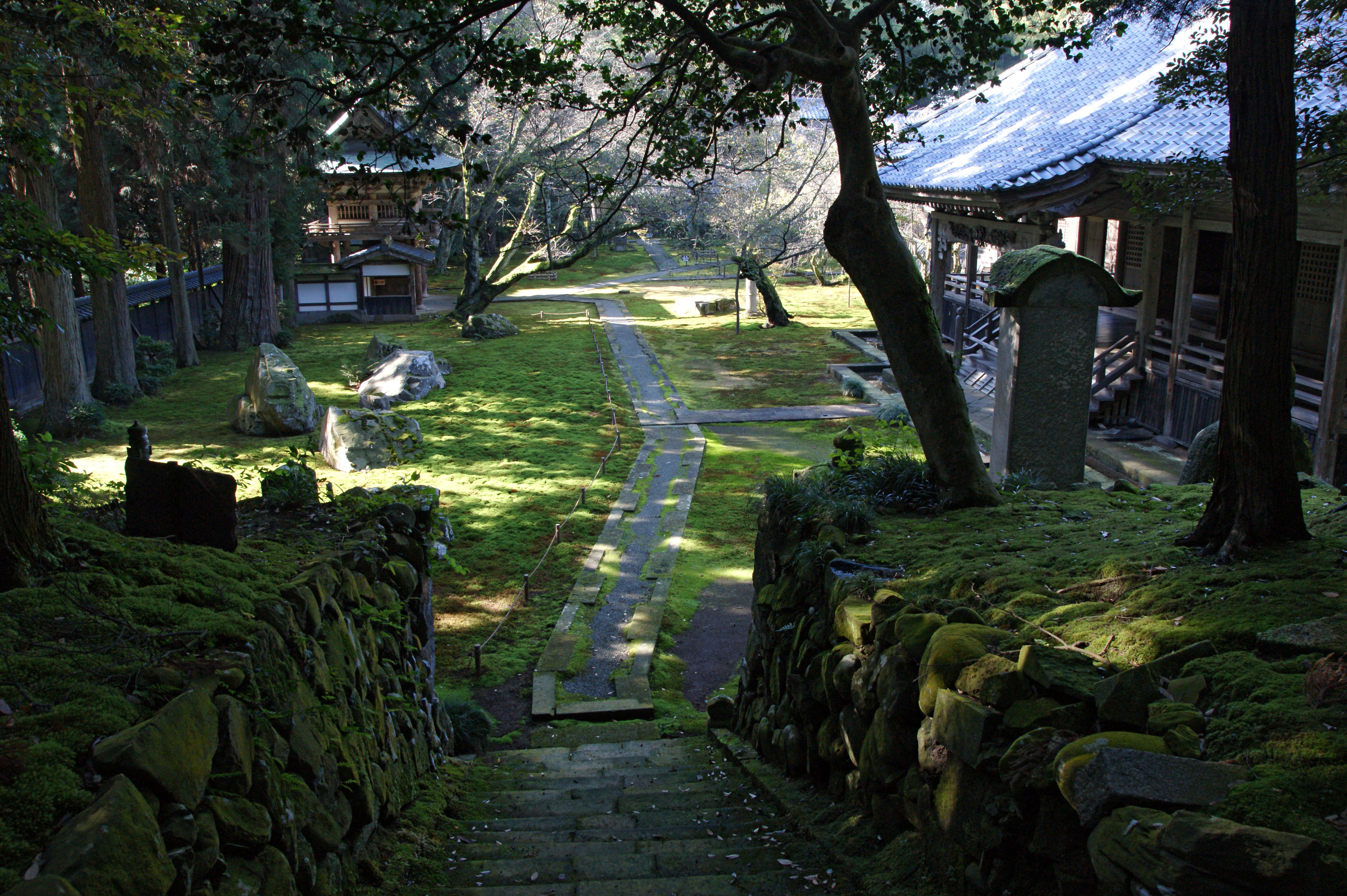
Stone garden（left）
Kannon-dō（right）

== See also ==
- List of National Treasures of Japan (crafts: others)
- List of Places of Scenic Beauty of Japan (Fukui)
