= List of cultural properties of Japan – paintings (Fukui) =

This list is of the cultural properties of Japan designated in the category of paintings (絵画, kaiga) for the Prefecture of Fukui.

== National Cultural Properties ==
As of 1 November 2014, fourteen Important Cultural Properties have been designated.

Property	Date	Municipality	Ownership	Comments	Image	Dimensions	Coordinates	Ref.
Descent of the Amida Triad with Twenty-Five Bodhisattvas, colour on silk 絹本著色阿弥陀三尊二十五菩薩来迎図 kenpon chakushoku Amida sanzon nijūgo bosatsu raigō zu	Heian period	Fukui	Anyō-ji (安養寺)			130.9 centimetres (51.5 in) by 63.9 centimetres (25.2 in)	36°03′35″N 136°12′35″E	
Kangyō Hensō Mandala, colour on silk 絹本著色観経変相曼荼羅図 kenpon chakushoku Kangyō Hensō mandala zu	Kamakura period	Tsuruga	Saifuku-ji (西福寺)			205 centimetres (81 in) by 135 centimetres (53 in)	35°39′25″N 136°01′54″E	
Taa Shōnin, colour on silk 絹本著色他阿上人真教像 kenpon chakushoku Taa Shōnin Shinkyō zō	Kamakura period	Sakai	Shōnen-ji (称念寺)			82 centimetres (32 in) by 48 centimetres (19 in)	36°08′37″N 136°15′06″E	
Jizō Bosatsu, colour on silk 絹本著色地蔵菩薩像 kenpon chakushoku Jizō bosatsu zō	Kamakura period	Sakai	Shōkai-ji (性海寺)			91 centimetres (36 in) by 40 centimetres (16 in)	36°12′42″N 136°09′12″E	
Jizō Bosatsu, colour on silk 絹本著色地蔵菩薩像 kenpon chakushoku Jizō bosatsu zō	Kamakura period	Sakai	Takidan-ji (瀧谷寺)			99 centimetres (39 in) by 39 centimetres (15 in)	36°13′19″N 136°08′46″E	
Asakura Toshikage, colour on silk 絹本著色朝倉敏景像 kenpon chakushoku Asakura Toshikage zō	Muromachi period	Fukui	Shingetsu-ji (心月寺)			83 centimetres (33 in) by 41 centimetres (16 in)	36°03′34″N 136°12′26″E	
Eight-Phase Nirvana painting, colour on silk 絹本著色八相涅槃図 kenpon chakushoku hassō nehan zu	Kamakura period	Echizen	Tsurugi Jinja (劔神社) (kept at the Nara National Museum)			231 centimetres (91 in) by 248 centimetres (98 in)	34°40′59″N 135°50′17″E	
Fudō Myōō and Three Attendants, colour on silk 絹本著色不動明王三童子像 kenpon chakushoku Fudō Myōō san dōji zō	Kamakura period	Obama	Mantoku-ji (萬徳寺)			113.7 centimetres (44.8 in) by 61.2 centimetres (24.1 in)	35°28′09″N 135°47′05″E	
Nirvana painting by Ryōzen, colour on silk 絹本著色仏涅槃図〈良全筆／〉 kenpon chakushoku Butsu nehan zu (Ryōzen hitsu)	1328	Eiheiji	Hongaku-ji (本覚寺)			160.9 centimetres (63.3 in) by 168 centimetres (66 in)	36°06′00″N 136°19′47″E	
Miroku Bosatsu, colour on silk 絹本著色弥勒菩薩像 kenpon chakushoku Miroku Bosatsu zō	Nanboku-chō period	Obama	Chōgen-ji (長源寺)			167 centimetres (66 in) by 76 centimetres (30 in)	35°29′36″N 135°44′40″E	
Miroku Bosatsu, colour on silk 絹本著色弥勒菩薩像 kenpon chakushoku Miroku Bosatsu zō	Kamakura period	Obama	Mantoku-ji (萬徳寺)			93.1 centimetres (36.7 in) by 52.7 centimetres (20.7 in)	35°28′09″N 135°47′05″E	
Arhats, colour on silk 絹本著色羅漢図 kenpon chakushoku rakan zu	Kamakura period	Fukui	Daian-ji (大安寺)	pair of scrolls		103.6 centimetres (40.8 in) by 45.6 centimetres (18.0 in)	36°06′07″N 136°10′04″E	
Shuyajin, colour on silk 絹本著色主夜神像 kenpon chakushoku Shuyajin zō	Goryeo	Tsuruga	Saifuku-ji (西福寺)	Goryeo Buddhist painting		161 centimetres (63 in) by 91 centimetres (36 in)	35°39′25″N 136°01′54″E	
Amida Nyorai, colour on silk 絹本著色阿弥陀如来像 kenpon chakushoku Amida Nyorai zō	Southern Song	Tsuruga	Saifuku-ji (西福寺)			140 centimetres (55 in) by 50 centimetres (20 in)	35°39′25″N 136°01′54″E	

== Prefectural Cultural Properties ==
As of 21 August 2014, sixty-one properties have been designated at a prefectural level.

Property	Date	Municipality	Ownership	Comments	Image	Dimensions	Coordinates	Ref.
Amida with Eight Great Bodhisattvas, gold and silver on purple silk 紫絹金銀泥絵阿弥陀八大菩薩像 shiken kingin doro-e Amida hachi-dai bosatsu zō	Goryeo	Tsuruga	Zenmyō-ji (善妙寺)	Goryeo Buddhist painting		155 centimetres (61 in) by 146 centimetres (57 in)	35°39′13″N 136°04′19″E	

== See also ==
- Cultural Properties of Japan
- List of National Treasures of Japan (paintings)
- Japanese painting
- List of Historic Sites of Japan (Fukui)
