= Fukui Prefectural Museum of Cultural History =

Prefectural museum in Fukui, Japan

- 福井県立歴史博物館
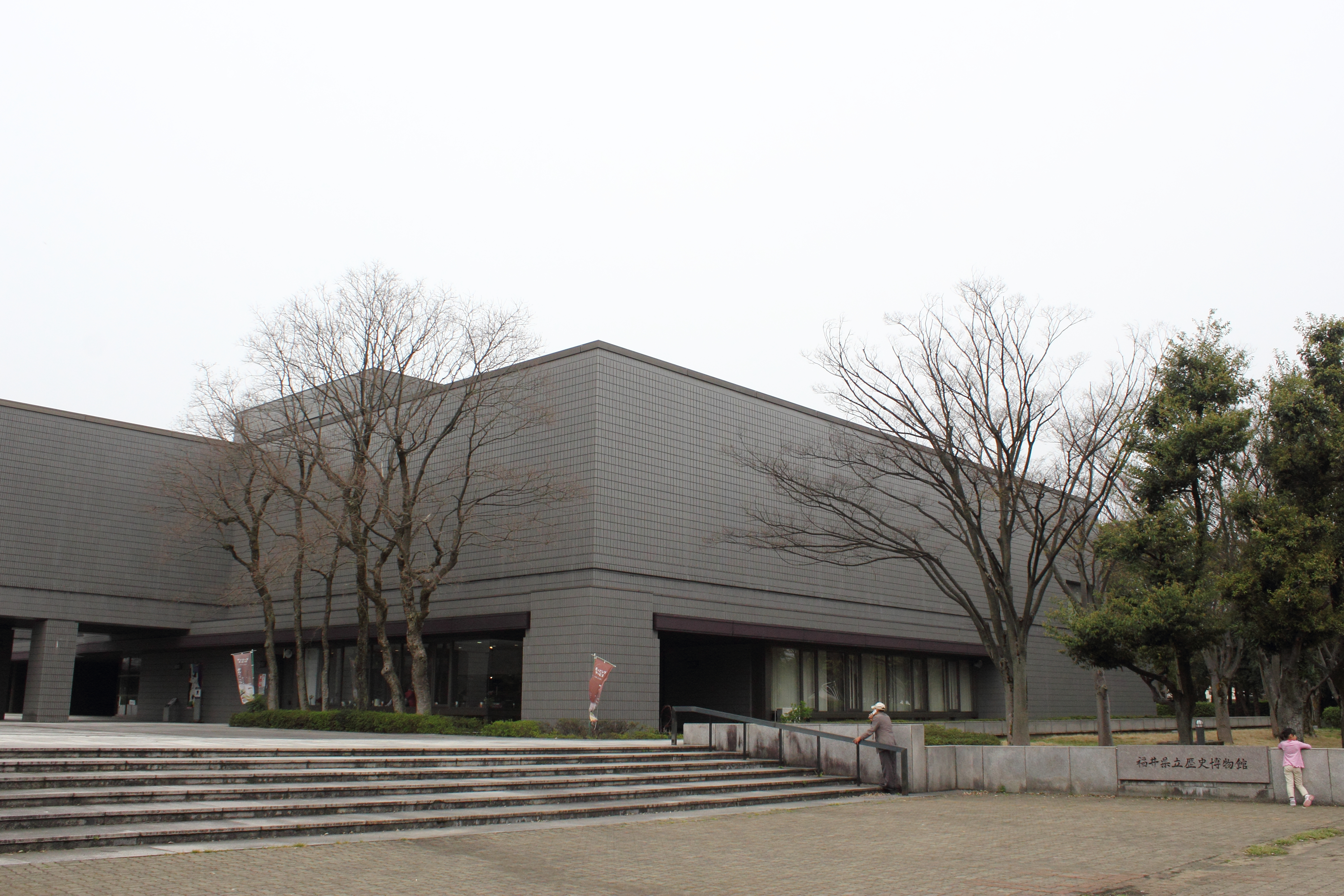
- Fukui Prefectural Museum of Cultural History
- Interactive map of the Fukui Prefectural Museum of Cultural History area

General information
- Location: 5-5 Ōmiya, Fukui, Fukui Prefecture, Japan
- Coordinates: 36°04′59″N 136°13′20″E
- Opened: 8 April 1984

Technical details
- Floor area: 9,044 m2

Website
- homepage

Fukui Prefectural Museum of Cultural History (福井県立歴史博物館, Fukui Kenritsu Rekishi Hakubutsukan) is a prefectural museum in Fukui, Japan, dedicated to the history and culture of Fukui Prefecture. The museum opened in 1984 and reopened after refurbishment in 2003.

== See also ==
- Wakasa Province
- Echizen Province
- List of Historic Sites of Japan (Fukui)
- Fukui Fine Arts Museum
