= William Lieberman =

American museum curator (1923–2005)

William Slattery Lieberman (February 14, 1923 – May 31, 2005) was an American museum curator.

== Early life and education ==
William Slattery Lieberman was born in Paris, France, to Max Lieberman, a scholar of late medieval church history, and Bertha Slattery. Raised in Paris and New York, he graduated from Swarthmore College with honors. After volunteering at MoMA in the early 1940s, he attended Harvard University, where he enrolled in Paul J. Sachs's museum studies course.

== Career ==
=== Museum of Modern Art (MoMA) ===
Lieberman's formal career at MoMA began in 1943. He became an assistant to the museum's founding director, Alfred H. Barr Jr., in 1945. His subsequent roles included being named director of the Department of Prints in 1949 and the founding director of the Department of Drawings in 1971.

During his tenure, Lieberman organized over 40 exhibitions. A major achievement was his 1968 acquisition of 38 works by Pablo Picasso and nine by Juan Gris from Gertrude Stein's art collection. Using his friendship with Stein's companion, Alice B. Toklas, Lieberman organized a syndicate of trustees to purchase the works for $6 million within 48 hours. His final exhibition at MoMA was the acclaimed "Art of the Twenties" in 1979.

=== The Metropolitan Museum of Art (The Met) ===
In 1979, Lieberman moved to The Met as chairman of the Department of 20th-Century Art. There, he organized more than 35 exhibitions and secured several major collections, often as gifts. These included the 1998 bequest of the Jacques and Natasha Gelman Collection, with 81 works from the School of Paris, and the 2003 acquisition of 100 works from the Pierre and Maria-Gaetana Matisse Collection. He was known for his detailed visual memory and for pairing works by different artists in his installations. At the time of his death, he was a special consultant for the museum.
