= Mantoku-ji =

Buddhist temple in Obama, Fukui, Japan

Mantoku-ji 萬徳寺
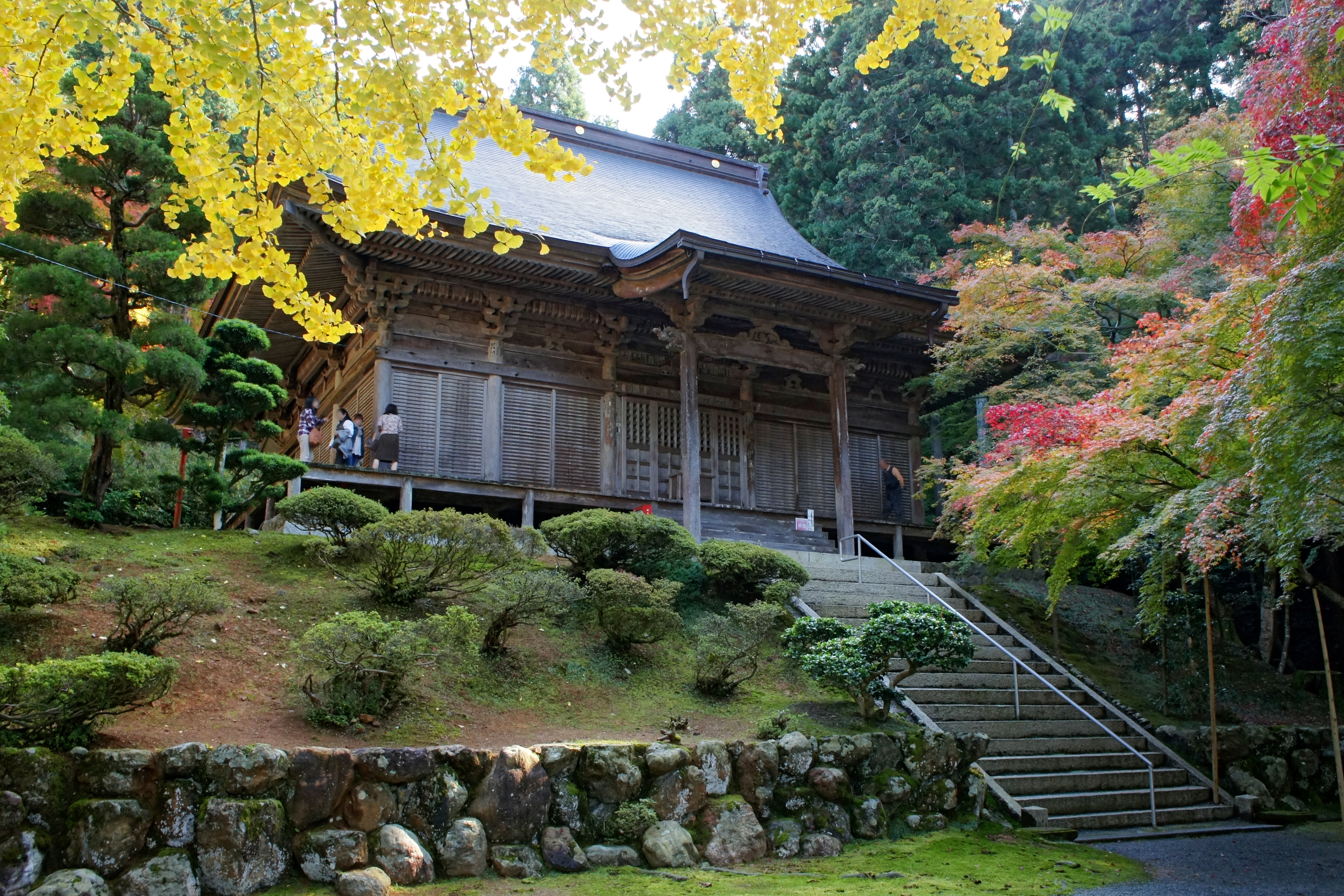
- Mantoku-ji main hall

- Mantoku-ji Mantoku-ji (Japan)

Religion
- Affiliation: Buddhism
- Deity: Amida Nyōrai
- Rite: Kōyasan Shingon sect

Location
- Location: 74-23 Kanaya, Obama-shi, Fukui-ken
- Country: Japan
- Interactive map of Mantoku-ji 萬徳寺
- Coordinates: 35°28′7.8″N 135°47′7″E

Architecture
- Completed: pre 1265

Mantoku-ji (萬徳寺) is a Buddhist temple belonging to the Kōyasan Shingon sect located in the city of Obama, Fukui, Japan. Its main image is a statue of Amida Nyōrai.

== History ==
The temple was originally named Gokuraku-ji (極楽寺) and appears in historical records only from 1265, although its foundation appears to have been much older. It converted from the Tendai sect to the Shingon sect during the Ōan period (1368-1374) and was renamed Shōshō-in (極楽寺). During the Sengoku period, it was sponsored by the Takeda clan and in 1544 Takeda Nobutomo granted it a charter as a refuge for women who were abused by their husbands. The temple was destroyed during the battles of the Genki period (1570-1573). After its restoration in 1602, it was renamed Mantoku-ji. In 1677, Sakai Tadanao, daimyo of Obama Domain under the Tokugawa shogunate ordered that the temple be relocated from its original site on the banks of the Otonashi River to its present location in the mountains.

== Cultural Properties ==
=== Important cultural properties ===
==== Amida Nyōrai ====
The honzon of Mantoku-ji is a seated statue of Amida Nyōrai (木造 阿弥陀如来坐像, kibori Amida Nyōrai-zazō) from the late Heian period. The statue has a height of 141.5 cm. It was designed an Important Cultural Property of Japan on August 20, 1913.

==== Fudo Myō-ō ====
The painting of Fudo Myō-ō (絹本著色不動明王三童子像, kenpon chakushoku Fudo Myō-ō oyobi san dōji-zō) is a hanging scroll depicting a standing Fudo Myō-ō with three attendants, dating from the Kamakura period. It is 113.7 cm long by 61.2 cm side. It was designated an Important Cultural Property of Japan on June 6, 1985

==== Miroku Bosatsu ====
The painting of Miroku Bosatsu (絹本著色弥勒菩薩像, kenpon chakushoku Miroku Bosatsu-zō) is a hanging scroll depicting a seated Miroku Bosatsu on a lotus throne in a pose of meditation, holding a small pagoda. The scroll has dimensions of 93.1 cm by 52.7 cm and dates from the mid-Kamakura period. It was designed an Important Cultural Property of Japan on August 2, 1901.

=== National Place of Scenic Beauty ===
==== Mantoku-ji gardens ====
The Japanese garden at Mantoku-ji covers 1500 square meters and combines elements of Japanese rock garden with ponds and tree arrangements. The garden was created in 1677, as is regarded as a typical example of early Edo period design. It became a nationally designated Place of Scenic Beauty on March 25, 1932.

=== National Natural Monument ===
==== Mantoku-ji Oyama Momiji ====
Located within the Mantoku-ji gardens is a large maple tree called the Oyama Momiji (萬徳寺のヤマモミジ), with an estimated age of over 500 years. It has a circumference of 3.6 meters at its base. It has been protected as a National Natural Monument since June 6, 1931.

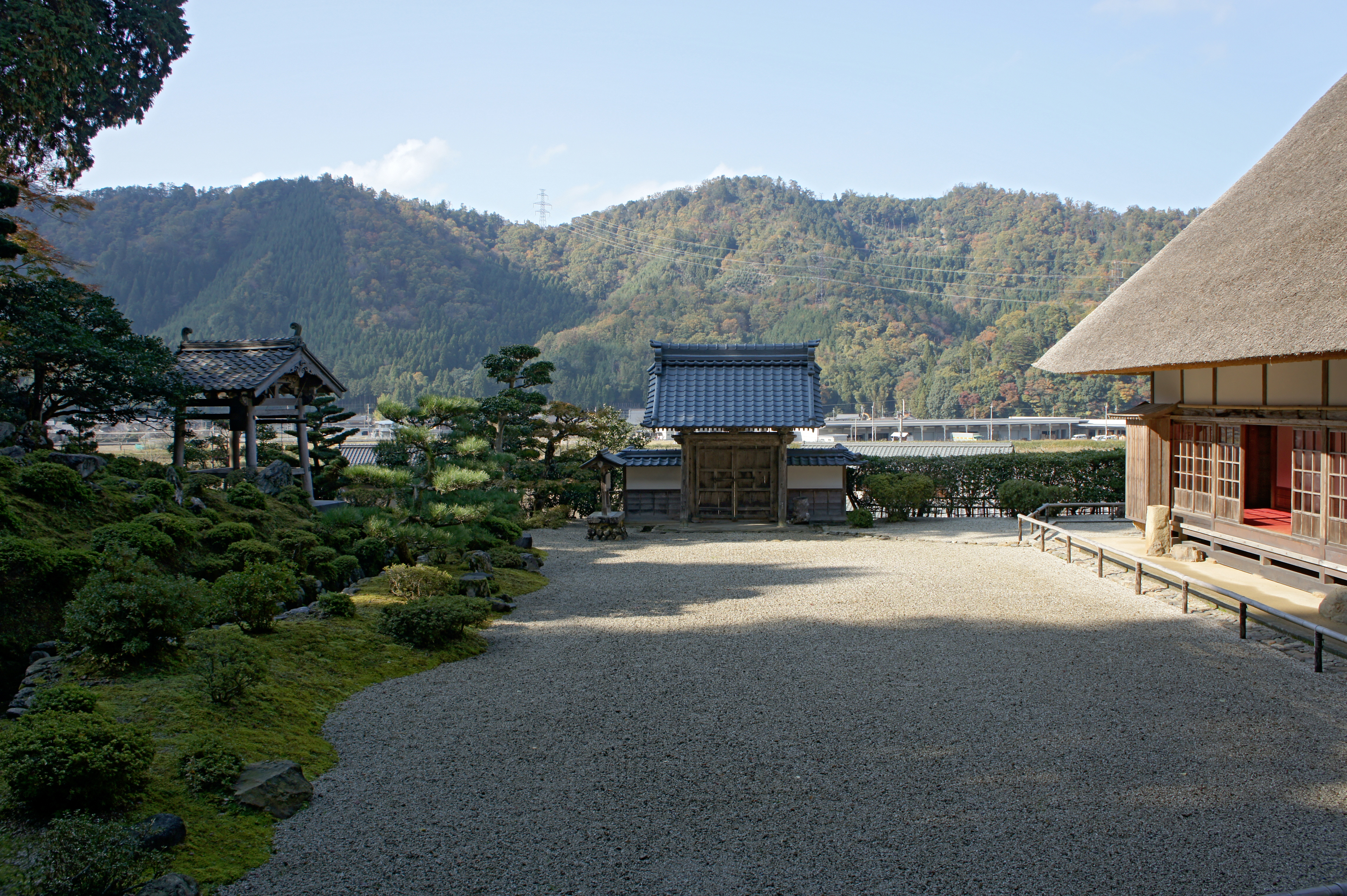
Precincts

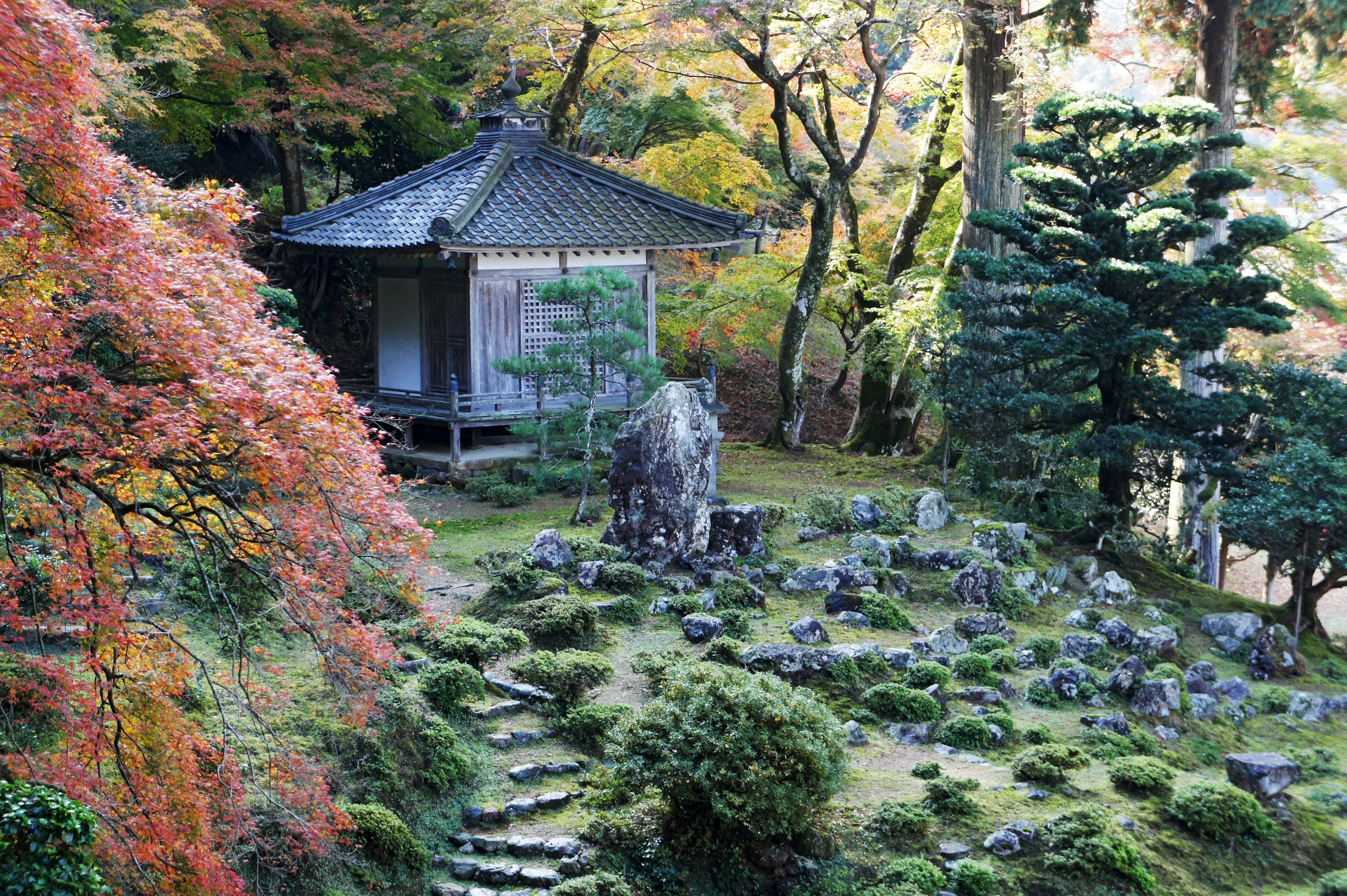
Japanese Garden

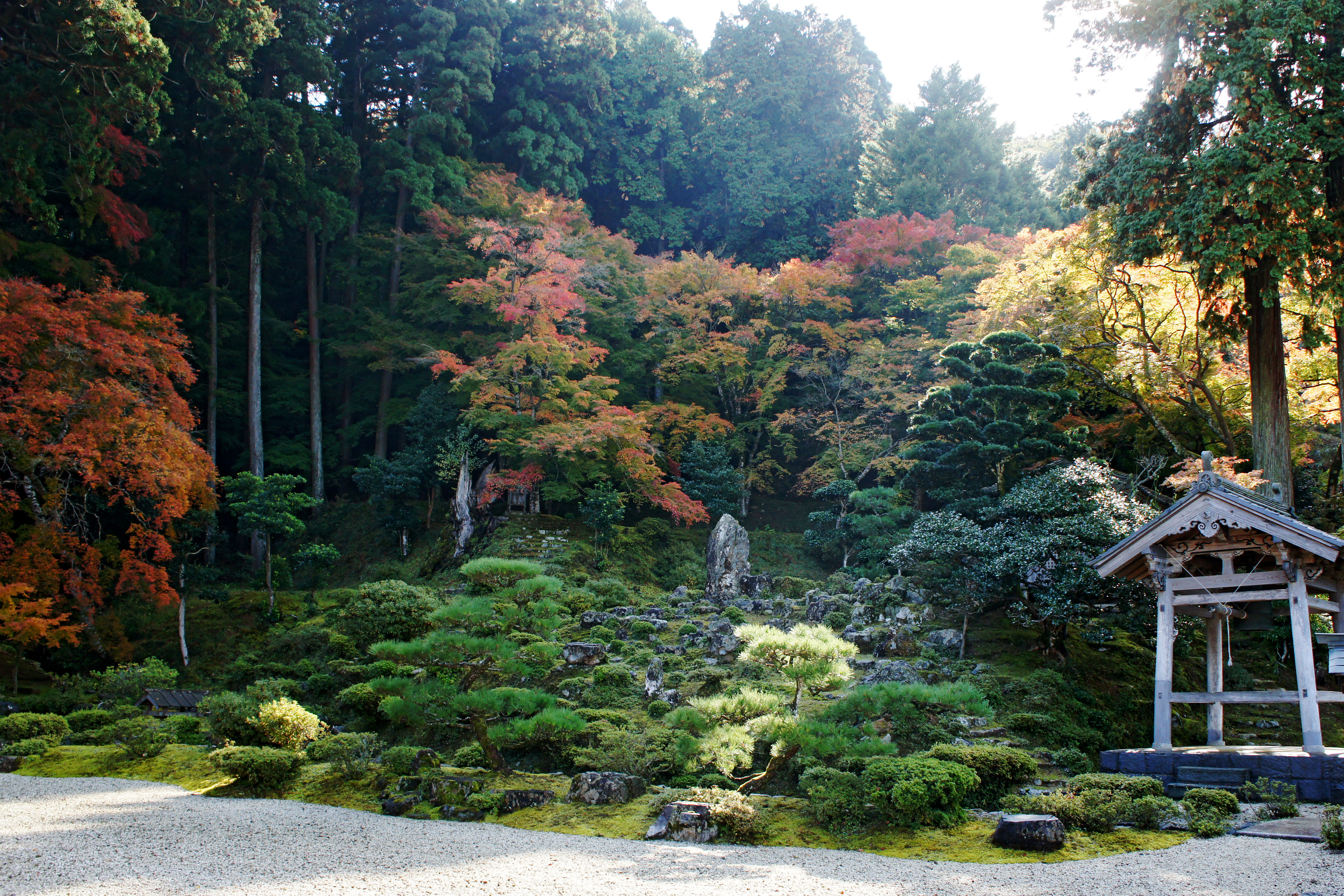
Garden and Oyama Maple

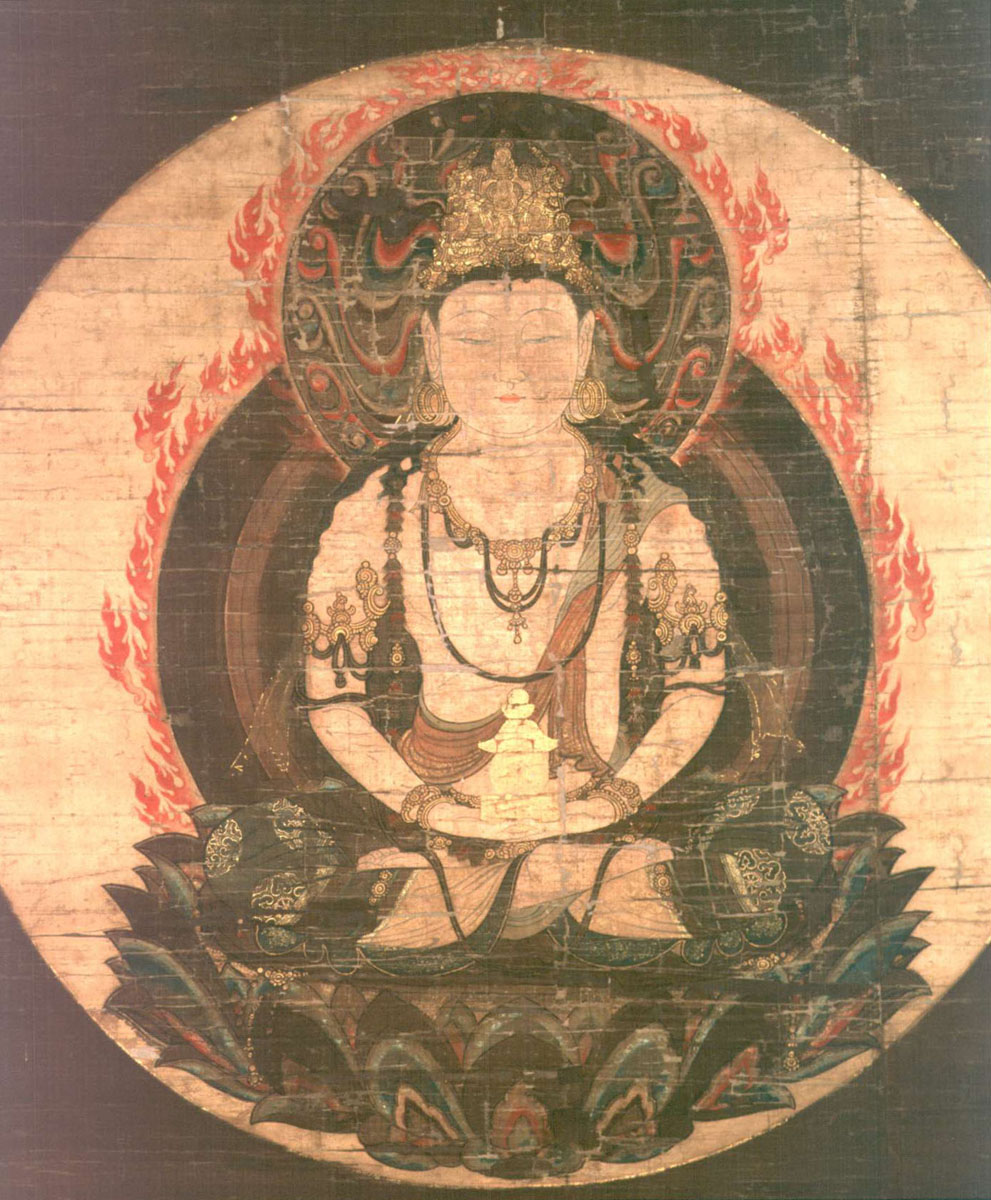
Miroku Bosatsu (ICP)

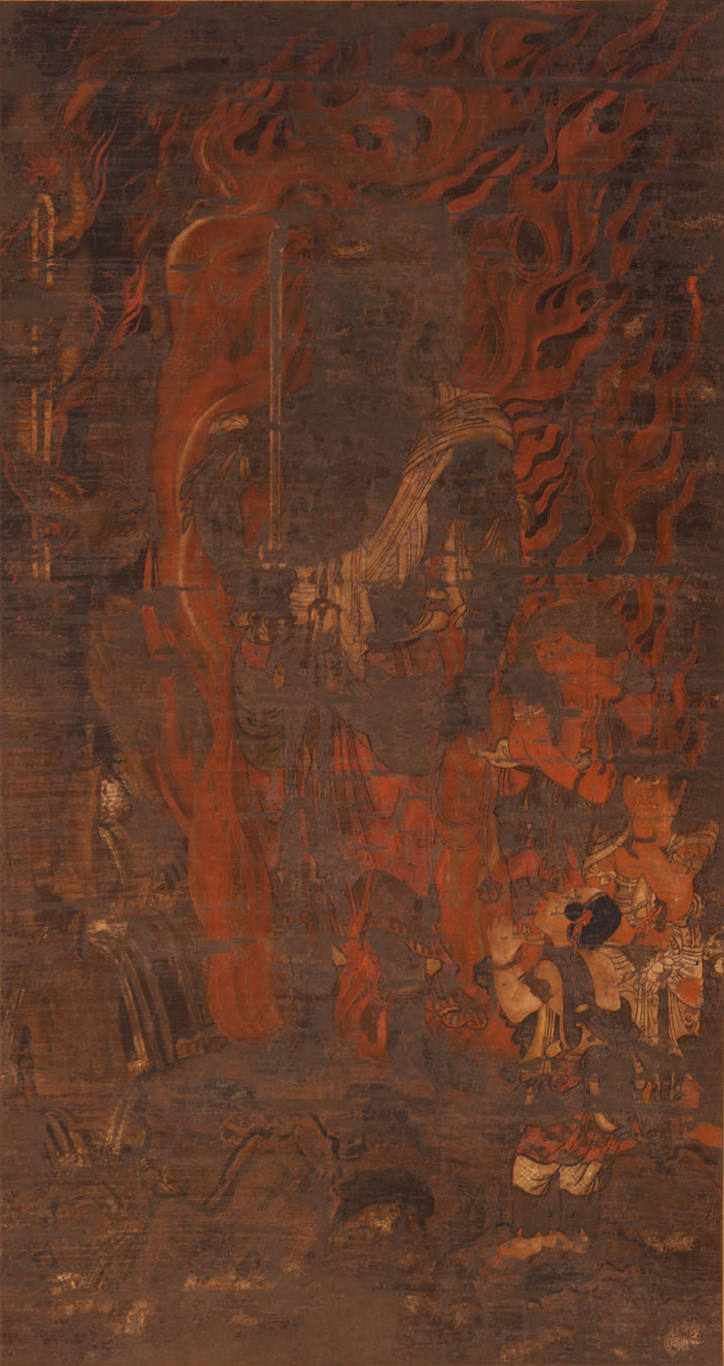
Fudo Myō-ō (ICP)

== See also ==
- List of Places of Scenic Beauty of Japan (Fukui)
