= Group Kyushu =

Group Kyūshū (九州派, Kyūshū-ha, also translated as "Kyūshū School") is an avant-garde art collective, formed in 1957 in the city of Fukuoka (Kyūshū Island) and active until the late 1960s. The group, whose composition fluctuated over time, had about 20 members that participated in several exhibitions in Fukuoka and Tokyo, produced a journal (Kyūshū-ha) relating their activity and their ambition and organized multiple performances and exhibitions in Fukuoka. Most of the members had no art education and located far from the nerve center of contemporary art that was Tokyo, therefore their local anchoring was intended to make the social institution of art more stable in Fukuoka and expand the art-practicing population. Kyūshū-ha aspired to repudiate modernism and reinterpret art. In its embrace of seikatsu-sha, or ordinary people who honestly live their everyday lives (seikatsu), it sought, as a collective, to create a dynamic movement (undō) that combined artistic and social innovation. This social ambition is representative of the social and political climate of the time and the birth of the labor union movement that was particularly vivid in the Fukuoka area (as shown by the Mitsui-Miike coalmine dispute in 1960), in which some members of the group participated. Stylistically, the artists of Kyūshū-ha experienced the shock of the gestural Art Informel in 1956–57, and toward and into the 1960s they shifted from expressionistic Informel painting to objet-based three-dimensional works that incorporated readymade everyday objects (with their trademark being tar). Their aesthetic, violent even nihilistic works, as well as their iconoclastic theoretical ambition brings them in line with the Anti-Art movement (Han-geijutsu), having notably exhibited in Yomiuri Independent, a hotbed of this trend. Despite their attempt to broaden their visibility, notably by emphasizing their regional and decentralized ambitions, the group never received the popular attention they had hoped for. Similarly, despite some critical attention, the uneven and unprofessional nature of their practices prevented them from founding a sustainable movement. Their first major experimentation with Happenings failed in 1962, and the group soon lost its collective unity, leading to the group's dissolution in the late 1960s.

== Members ==
Group Kyūshū's membership fluctuated a lot over the years, generally averaged twenty or so members. A membership list was published in each issue of its journal Kyūshū-ha, up through volume 5 (1961).

Takami Sakurai, Osamu Ochi, Mamoru Matano and Yasuyuki Ishibashi were key founding members who participated in the Persona exhibition (Perusona-ten), an outdoor exhibition along the outer wall of the Fukuoka prefectural offices that took place in November 1956.

Other core members include Mitsuko Tabe, Yoriko Chō, Takeshi Owari, Hidesuke Obata, Aiko Ōguro, Uichi Ōyama, Junnosuke Miyazaki, Shigeharu Obana, Toku Yonekura, and Toshio Taniguchi. Together with the key founding members, these eight made important intellectual contributions to the group, with all but Obana and Taniguchi staying with the group through the end.

Jūtarō Yamauchi, Mokuma Kikuhata, and Tadashi Hataraki were critical of Sakurai. Yamauchi and Kikuhata, together with Ochi, formed the spin-off group Dōkutsu-ha (Cave School).

Other artists have also participated, more or less temporarily, in the activities of the group: Yōji Kuroki, Ken'ichirō Terada, Shin Kinoshita, Seiryō Surusumi, Hidesaburō Saitō, Yoshiharu Funaki, Yutaka Yagara, Masatoshi Katae, Sumio Morigana.

Kyūshū-ha was characterized by its democratic, non-hierarchical, that paralleled Circle Village (a poet circle created by Gan Tanigawa and also based in Fukuoka). It consisted of due-paying members : at the time of its founding the monthly due was 1,000 yen (later raised to 2,000 yen). Special fees of 10,000 yen were collected when the group held the Kyūshū-ha exhibition in Tokyo and participated in the Yomiuri Independent Exhibition.

Almost none of the members of Group Kyūshū were formally trained as artists, and hailing from the southernmost island of Japan (Kyūshū), they were remote from the center of haute culture, Tokyo. Most of the group members had no art education, nor any contacts in the art world in Tokyo or internationally. Reacting against what they saw as a stifling exhibition system that relied on personal connections and master-disciple relationships, they put great energy into fighting against the various institutions of the art establishment. Kyūshū-ha was a group of painters residing in and around Fukuoka, who were first and foremost seikatsu-sha and rōdō-sha (blue-collar workers and other wage earners) strongly motivated by the collective creation of a "movement" (undō). They had very little money and their shared workspace was an off-season beach cabana. The rise of the labor union movement, represented by the Mitsui Miike dispute, formed the ideological background for the group. Kyūshū-ha sought to pursue an artistic revolution without neglecting the revolution of seikatsu in the socio-political sphere, bringing art to the normal working class was one of their main goals. Members discussed and often fought over the direction of the group, which perhaps contributed to frequent factional splits. Most significantly, Sakurai's expansive "people's front" strategy, intended to encourage an expansion of membership among the masses, was ultimately defeated by Kikuhata's guerrilla tactics, which favored a group of a select and talented few, leading to the creation of a spin-off group Dōkutsu-ha (Cave School) in 1959.

== Activities ==
=== Early years (1957-1959) ===
The activities of the group encompassed activities as studio critique and other meetings; the presentation of exhibitions, including the annual Kyūshū-ha exhibition (1957-1967), to showcase members' works; and the publication of the journal Kyūshū-ha (1957-1968). Especially in the early years, the group endeavored to create a broad alliance with other anti-establishment artists and groups, issuing a statement protesting the conservative Fukuoka Prefectural Art Exhibition and organizing the Kyūshū Independent Exhibition in 1958 and 1959. Sakurai, along with Matano, participated in the Persona exhibition (Perusona-ten) in November 1956, which took place in Fukuoka and marked the beginning of Kyūshū-ha. In August 1957 was held the exhibition 18 Artists of Group Q, at the Iwataya department store, Fukuoka, signaling the official formation of the group, followed by the first publication of Kyūshū-ha journal, in September. Around February 1958, the group rented a clubhouse on the Momoji swimming beach, which would become their main production and gathering place. The works produced there both individually and collaboratively were exhibited at the Yomiuri Independent in March 1958, with some bearing the collective authorship of Kyūshū-ha. At the occasion, the Group tried to submit Garbage Piece. While packing up for the exhibition, the group members found a pile of garbage in front of their atelier. As a joke they decided to bring the garbage to the exhibition as well, after Kikuhata urinated on it. The piece was rejected, and Kyūshū-ha earned the dubious distinction of being the first art group to have had one of their works rejected from the open-submission Yomiuri exhibition. In August 1958, they held the first Kyūshū-ha exhibition at Ginza Gallery in Tokyo, launching the more or less annual tradition of the group's collective presentation in Tokyo that continued through 1965.

During this early period, stylistically, the gestural Informel abstraction dominated, many members incorporating asphalt and objets. Asphalt, imbued with theoretical, social and historical significances, was the most important material to characterize Kyūshū-ha during this period. A cheap, mundane material, asphalt was closely associated with local everyday life. Its black color could symbolize the coalmining industry that sustained the economy of Kyūshū and its shiny materiality, the energy of the bottom-living masses. It was an emblematic material suited to Kyūshū-ha's endeavor to create historically and socially meaningful art. These first years are also marked by the introduction of objets (ready-made objects) : Sakurai (Lynching, rinchi) and Kikuhata (Requiem, Sōsōkyoku) incorporated dimension objets in two-dimensional paintings; while Ochi used objets as the support for painting. The Group has also set up collaborative creation protocols, questioning the modern notion of individualism, with pieces like Straw Mat- Straw Mat (Mushiro-mushiro) byYamauchi, Ochi, and Ishibashi; and Torn- Apart Individuality (Hikisakareta) attributed to fifteen members. However, the group already showed signs of disharmony. Sakurai's plan to expand the membership met resistance; Terada was forced out because he continued to participate in the exhibitions of Nika; as a result, three primary members, Ochi, Kikuhata, and Yamauchi, left and organized Dōkutsu-ha (Cave School) in late 1959.

=== Middle period (1960-1963) ===
Between 1960 and 1962, the group radicalized its approach to objet-based works, exhibiting earthy and strange works made of paint, reed mats, wood, rope, wire, springs, nails, cardboard, mannequin parts, cement. Unlike Pop artists which used the products of contemporary society to critique life dominated by mass production and mass consumption as impersonal, Kyūshū-ha artists embraced articles simply and manually made and used at farming villages, such as mushiro straw mats (Ishibashi); sudare reed blinds, cigarette butts, screens (Ochi); and ropes (Tabe). Ochi continued to pioneer in this direction. In his sometimes menacing objets, he shed the strategy of early Kyūshū-ha, which deployed a copious amount of material and produced huge works in order to shock the viewer. However, the danger in Ochi' s method was that it would sooner or later lead to nihilism. The desperate nihilism found in these works strikes a very different chord from the earlier Kyūshū-ha, which was characterized by primal energy and an optimistic impulse for destruction. These works now intimated the growing isolation and imminent crisis Kyūshū-ha faced as an avant-garde collective. Although Ochi was the member to enjoy the most critical attention in Kyūshū-ha, he was no stranger to what can be described as an "exit-less" situation, the only thing left for them to do was self-destruct.

Happenings that involved bodily acts became a major element that characterized the late-middle period which climaxed at A Grand Meeting of Heroes staged at the Momoji swimming beach in November 1962. They performed a series of happenings composing what they called a “festival of darkness” (yami no shukusai), including Obata's slaughtering of chickens, Ōyama's burning of an altar made of junk objects, Tabe's driving of nails into the heads of mannequins, Junnosuke's holes digging on the sand beach. Some members of Group Ongaku were also invited, whose more urbane and intellectual approach to performance contrasted sharply with that of Kyūshū-ha. The Grand Meeting itself had grown out of a critical failure, with no audience attending. The Group held the second Kyūshū-ha exhibition in its hometown, Fukuoka, in December 1963, at the Shinten Kaikan hall, but the attention of the critics and the art world had already waned.

=== Late period (1964-1968) ===
In March and April 1964, some Kyūshū-ha members had solo exhibitions at Naiqua Gallery, Tokyo, which constitute the group's last substantial activity in Tokyo. Sakurai left Japan when he quit the Nishi-Nippon newspaper company after the long-winded labor dispute that lasted half a year and move to the U.S. in March 1965. In March 1966, Ochi also left Japan and joined Sakurai in San Francisco to form the "San Francisco Kyūshū-ha." The artists that stayed in Fukuoka held the last Kyūshū-ha exhibition in 1965. In February 1968, when the exhibition Trends of Contemporary Art in Kyūshū was held, the name of Kyūshū-ha no longer appeared on the roster of participants, which still included those of individual Kyūshū-ha members. Kyūshū-ha no longer existed as a cohesive group.

== Impact ==
Initially, what brought the group together was a shared ideal of artists as workers and seikatsu-sha (everyday people), which the group's theorist Matano articulated as an interest in a "new image of humanity". Sakurai echoed Matano in criticizing conventional painting for its "inability to jettison atmospheric [effects]" and expressed his desire to establish "a new idea of humanity supported by a new ethic that is clearly manifested." The question was not formal - whether to choose abstraction or figuration. Rather, they envisioned a painting in which the material presented an image and the subject matter addressed social reality. Influenced in various ways by L'Art Informel, Kyūshū-ha worked to foreground material in their work: rather than seeing the art work as representing some remote referent, the material itself and the artists' interaction with it became the main point. The freeing up of gesture was another legacy of L'Art Informel, and the members of Group Kyūshū took to it with great verve, throwing, dripping, and breaking material, sometimes destroying the work in the process.

These practices are part of a larger movement, called Anti-Art (hangeijutsu), of which Kyūshū-ha is considered one of the most practitioners. This qualification (next to more famous artist groups such as Neo Dada or Hi-Red Center) highlights the relative success of Kyushu's strategy to reach out to the Tokyo scene. To begin with, the naming of the group was highly strategic, decisively carrying a sense of regionalism. In the same way, their communication strategy put forward a regional specificity, which would reinforce their anti-art elitist discourse : the poster of Kyūshū-ha at Ginza Gallery in 1961 stating "In the Tokyo region: Kyūshū-ha makes a surprise appearance!"; or when the artist Akasegawa Genpei created an illustration for art magazine Bijutsu techō, representing the group as a huge bottle of shōchū liquor (the drink of choice in Kyūshū), labeled "Kyūshū-ha" and plunked down on a wood counter bearing the inscription "Tokyo". The symbiotic link between Anti-Art and Kyūshū-ha's Tokyo strategy is particularly manifest in the Group's participation at the Yomiuri Independent exhibition series, which had served as a hotbed of Anti-Art.

Despite its humanist ambitions, the group never managed to find the popular response it was looking for. In 1962, in the notice of A Grand Meeting of Heroes, Sakurai went so far as to say : "People hate us so much that we are on the cutting edge of local hostility." Regarding the critical reception, although Kyūshū-ha and Neo Dada are accepted as two representative examples of Anti-Art, Kyushu-ha did not have the same access to the Tokyo-based mass media and explored many directions, which went beyond the Anti-Art trend and made the readability of their work as a group more difficult. Starting from an initial postulate that the artistic practice should be deprofessionalized and decentralized, the group was met with vehement criticism from the art world, as Fukuoka-based critic Harumichi Taniguchi has stated that Kyūshū-ha was "the 'avant-garde that never caught up,' whose ineptitude and lack of refinement are hard to hide" or Yoshiaki Tono's designation of the Group as kamikaze avant-garde. After the dissolution of the group, it was not until 1988 that a retrospective exhibition was dedicated to them. It was frequently claimed that an objective study of the group was impossible because it had left few works and little documentary material behind. The art-historical examination of Kyūshū-ha began with its first retrospective exhibition organized by Fukuoka Art Museum in 1988, curated by Kuroda Raiji.

== See also ==
- Anti-art
