= Sayako Kishimoto =

Japanese artist (1939–1988)

- Born: October 1, 1939; Nagoya, Japan
- Died: December 1, 1988 (aged 49); Nagoya, Japan
- Education: Tama Art University
- Movement: Neo-Dada

Sayako Kishimoto (岸本 清子, Kishimoto Sayako; October 1, 1939 – December 1, 1988) was a Japanese artist who worked across mediums including paintings, drawings, and performances. Best known as one of the few female members in the short-lived art collective Neo-Dada Organizers, Kishimoto investigated female identity and the definition of a female avant-garde artist through destruction-oriented practices in the 1960s. Beginning in the 1970s, Kishimoto's interests shifted toward examining and questioning the political power structure of Japanese society as well as that of the U.S.-Japan relations, and she briefly adopted the style of Pop Art. Later on, she expanded the scope of her artistic inquiry and began to invent a worldview of her own. Kishimoto envisioned a society in which everyone would strive to reach the bottom of a hierarchy instead of the top as in real life. Kishimoto translated her utopian view onto several canvases in the 80s, where motifs of animals and expressive strokes constituted modern allegories. While combatting cancer on the sickbed during the last few years of her life, Kishimoto continued to probe the personal and the political through expressive works on paper as well as performances.

== Biography ==
=== Early life ===
On October 1, 1939, Kishimoto was born as the third child and second daughter to Kishimoto Ken’ichi and Natsuko. Her father was a psychiatrist, and her mother Natsuko (b. 1906) had briefly pursued a career as a painter. In 1946, Kishimoto attended the Nagoya Municipal Yagoto Elementary School (Nagoya Shiritsu Yagoto Shōgakkō) and in 1952, the Nanzan Middle School where she joined the art club. Against her parents' wishes of going to a medical college, Natsuko had moved to Kyoto and studied painting, before moving back to Nagoya to get married. The encouragement of her mother Natsuko, who was unable to sustain her dream of becoming a painter, played an important role in the start of Kishimoto's artistic career.

Kishimoto then studied in the Art Department of the Aichi Prefectural Asahigaoka Senior High School. Graduates from the same program included Genpei Akasegawa, Shūsaku Arakawa, and Iwata Shin’ichi (member of Zero Jigen group), who were two years ahead of Kishimoto. After graduation in 1958, Kishimoto had first aimed for the Tokyo University of the Arts where she could study Western oil painting. However, Kishimoto's father was reportedly overwhelmed by the vast amount of oil paintings in museums when he traveled to Europe for an academic conference. Therefore, taking on her father's advice of switching to Japanese painting, the young artist changed course right before the university entrance exam and subsequently failed it. Kishimoto studied for another year but her second attempt to gain admission to the Tokyo University of the Arts once again fell through. Instead, Kishimoto enrolled at Tama Art University to study Japanese painting in April 1959. This experience filled with stress and failure might have caused bipolar disorder for the artist. An interview with the artist's sister Yoshiko Iida unveiled the family's concern for Kishimoto later on. Iida said, “If Sayako had succeeded to enter the Tokyo University of the Arts, she would have followed the path of a proper artist. Since she became awakened to the avant-garde in Tama Art University, it was probably the turning point in her life. All the family members were tossed around by her behaviors.”

=== 1960 - Neo-Dada Organizers ===
At Tama Art University, Kishimoto became acquainted with the idea of avant-garde. After seeing an exhibition of the Neo-Dada Organizers at the end of her freshman year, Kishimoto joined the group in 1960. During Neo-Dada's short, half-year lifespan, Kishimoto was one of the only female members in a group led by male members including Ushio Shinohara and Masunobu Yoshimura. Aiming to dismantle existing conventions in art, Neo-Dada artists presented shockingly destructive performances and employed mass media to expose their works and themselves. Kishimoto was persuaded to become involved in events directed by other male artists with the goal of attracting media attention. In an advertising event for the group, titled Beach Show for TBS television in July 1960, Kishimoto was bandaged up, hung in the air on a tree, and had fireworks lit beneath her on the Zaimokuza Beach in Kamakura. The male artists also threw dirt and ashes on her. Art historian Mayumi Kagawa argues that Kishimoto's position was “tenuous” and the artist was “easily reversed from the subject of action to the object of male sadism.” While Kishimoto's presence in the group was a bold, boundary-breaking move for a female artist at the time, she was not regarded as an equal by her male peers. Kishimoto's presence resembled that of a mascot and provided a female form for the group to experiment with. Although Kishimoto had participated in at least two of Neo-Dada's exhibitions, none of her works from this period survive, and even her fellow artists could not remember any of her works.

=== 1960s - After Neo-Dada ===
Between 1959 and 1979, Kishimoto worked primarily in Tokyo. Kishimoto exhibited in the 12th to 15th Yomiuri Indépendant Exhibitions from 1960 to 1963, and had her first solo show at Naiqua Gallery in 1964. After the dissolution of Neo-Dada, Kishimoto remained within the circle of this group of artists and continued to produce works that shared their ideology. In 1966, at her solo exhibition Narusisu no bohyō [The Gravestones of Narcissus] at Tsubaki Kindai Gallery, Tokyo, Kishimoto presented a multimedia installation that announced her stance on the female identity. In the center of the one-room gallery sat a gigantic plaster skull, behind which were two gravestones with a silhouette of a baby falling into the grave. On the surrounding walls were posed lifesize plaster figures of males and females in uncanny postures. The figure on the back wall, in particular, appeared to be dissolving. By exposing and manipulating bodily forms as well as establishing the resonance between birth and death, The Gravestones of Narcissus revealed Kishimoto's rejection of the feminine body. The idea of male dominance in art had shaped Kishimoto's projected image then of how a real avant-garde artist should behave. Only by denying her feminine side would she be recognized by her male-majority fellows as a professional. The works in this as well as a previous exhibition, The Medal of Narcis (1965), were burned on the banks of the Tama River after the exhibitions closed.

While attempting to overcome their male-centered logic, Kishimoto retained the destructive aspects of the Neo-Dada Organizers as a guiding proposition. Her first solo exhibition in her hometown Nagoya was at Sakura Gallery, titled Look Left!!. Kishimoto, in front of many visitors as well as former Neo-Dada colleagues such as Ushio Shinohara, Nobuaki Kojima, and Tomio Miki, destroyed her works by spraying white house paint over them. She also covered herself with paint and eventually cut her hair. Recalling her practices in the 60s, Kishimoto later wrote, “I believed that ART could not serve its original role and function as the releasing machine to uplift the mind of the viewer unless I completely broke with my narcissism as a woman and a human being. Those works were the very result of my desperate act of self-annihilation at age twenty-six.” In 1968, at her solo exhibition Romantic Structure at the Ginhodo Gallery in Ginza, Kishimoto covered the walls and ceiling of the space with large-scale drawings of flower petals. From this exhibition until the end of 70s, Kishimoto temporarily renamed herself Mari Kishimoto. Despite being in the midst of the avant-garde scene, around 1969, Kishimoto took a break from her performance-based activities in Tokyo. Reportedly she ran several planning companies and got married in 1973 before divorcing in four years.

=== 1970s - Pop Art ===
Although having retreated from under the spotlight, Kishimoto continued to create works, mostly paintings and drawings, adopted a Pop art style while engaging with broad political issues that emerged in Japanese society then. So far, two paintings of this kind have been identified. In one of them, Title Unknown (Spit out Blood, The Showa Genroku, Oppekepe...) (ca. early 1970s) Kishimoto manifested cynicism towards the U.S.-Japan relationship by collaging a dozen of popular motifs. The artist depicted two Japanese male figures — on the left Otojirō Kawakami, a Meiji performing artist known for his Oppekepe songs criticizing the wealth gap in Japanese society, and on the right, Yukio Mishima, the famous literary figure who committed suicide in 1970 as a ritual act to object the Japanese government. Between the two figures was a line of text in red — “Crying While Spitting Blood," signaling the two painted figures' frustration toward society, which might echo Kishimoto's feelings as well. Near the bottom, one can see a cheetah violently biting a seal, against the background of seemingly erupting Mt. Fuji. On the far right is a small portrait of Yoko Ono and John Lennon, and above that is a bow tied with Japanese and American flags placed in front of the Japanese Diet. The two motifs of Ono-Lennon marriage and the tied bow resonate with each other and point to the Japanese-U.S. relationship, specifically the renewal of the Japanese-U.S. Security Treaty (Anpo) in 1970, which many students had protested.

In January 1976, Kishimoto participated in "Artists Union Symposium '76" and in July, exhibited her work Rain at the Women Filmmaker's Festival. In May 1979, Kishimoto had an operation to treat breast cancer and since then officially moved back to Nagoya. Since then, she had continued to work on her own while combating both manic-depressive illness and breast cancer.

=== 1980s - Utopian Vision ===
Kishimoto's practice in the 80s centered on her reflection on and critique of the power hegemony, both in the realm of gender as well as that between nations, species, and beyond. The artist believed that the human society at large had been shaped into a pyramidal structure, in which one was compelled to dominate, conquer, and overtake others in order to move up. She asserted,

“The System will change as our perspective changes. I believe this inverted triangle structure which presents a downward competition, not an uprising one, in other words a structure where we accept others’ blazes and support one another without drawing attention, will be political landscape of the 80s and 21st century. Politics in the 80s should be built upon a vision where people make their policy initiatives based on objectives to foster world peace.”

The ideal society pictured by Kishimoto involved an inverted triangle structure within which people competing to move down, to the bottom. Meanwhile, she named herself “messenger from hell,” someone who is situated at the very bottom and thereby waiting on the most ideal ground of the imagined society. Based on this view, Kishimoto created several expressive, dynamic paintings on long, horizontal canvases and frequently adopted various animals as the protagonist of her visual narratives. Consisting of four panels, White Mountain Gorilla (1981) portrays a captured gorilla destroying the cage and releasing itself, a story of striving for freedom. In 21c. Erotical Flying Machines — A trip to the Galaxy (1983), Kishimoto illustrated the journey of a pink grasshopper, an embodiment of the artist herself, traveling with other insects and overcoming difficulties before landing on a utopia. Furthermore, The Civilization of Monsters (1983) manifests a radiant scenery of dinosaurs, which echoes the artist's view that a more ideal world existed on the earth before the emergence of humans, thereby before the rise of patriarchy and phallicism.

In the 80s, Kishimoto also participated in several political activities, including the "Angry Stab Diversion" campaign in 1982. The campaign was organized to oppose the construction of the Takanori Ogisu Art Museum in Nagoya. Besides, she ran in the national election for a seat House of Councillors as a candidate of the Zatsumin Party (雑民党).

=== Last Years ===
In 1986, when breast cancer recurred for Kishimoto, she started to spend most of her time in the hospital. Despite in frail health, the artist persisted in creating performances and works on paper. In May 1988, Kishimoto began her sickbed portrait sketch series, and the works were assembled together in the Sickbed Sketch Exhibition - Revival of the Soul at the Love Collection Gallery, Nagoya in June. In September, the ASG Garanya in Nagoya organized what is believed to be Kishimoto's last exhibition before her death. Titled Momotaro Onna Samurai/Kishimoto Sayako's Evening of Song and Narrative, the exhibition was said to be a performance and its flyer wrote “Momotaro-Samurai girl, formerly known as messenger from hell! Spiritual revival!!.”

Sayako Kishimoto died on December 1, 1988.

== Exhibition History ==
=== Solo Exhibition ===
1964 - Naiqua Gallery, Tokyo (first solo exhibition)
1965 - The Medal of Narcis, Tsubaki Kindai Gallery, Tokyo
1966 - The Grave-Stones of Narcissus, Tsubaki Kindai Gallery, Tokyo
1967 - Look Left!!, Sakura Gallery, Nagoya
1968 - Romantic Structure, Ginhodo Gallery, Ginza, Tokyo
1977 - The Last Supper, Meiji Gallery, Tokyo
1980 - The Breakdown of the Genesis- and Sea, Box Gallery, Nagoya
1981 - I am a Flying Red Cat!, Gallery 79, Nagoya
White Mountain Gorilla, Gallery 79, Nagoya
1982 - Principle of Time Machine, Love Collection Gallery, Nagoya
Roppongi Art Club, Tokyo
1983 - 21C. Erotical Flying Machines - A Trip to the Galaxy, Love Collection Gallery, Nagoya
21C. Erotical Girls, Ginza Bijutsu Club, Tokyo
Civilization of Monsters, Shizuoka Bijutsu-sha
1984 - Japanese Flowers Series - 1. Mountain Cherry, Love Collection Gallery, Nagoya
Japanese Flowers Series - 2. Lily, Love Collection Gallery, Nagoya
1985 - Japanese Flowers Series - 3. Seven Vernal Flowers, Love Collection Gallery, Nagoya
Kojiki (Japanese Mythology), Love Collection Gallery, Nagoya
1986 - Macbeth/Super Ichiza Participation, Love Collection Gallery, Nagoya
1988 - Sickbed Sketch Exhibition - Revival of the Soul, Love Collection Gallery, Nagoya
Momotaro Onna Zamrai/Kishimoto Sayako’s Evening of Song and Narrative, ASG Garando, Nagoya
1990 - The Posthumous Exhibition of Sayako Kishimoto, Electricity Museum Building, Nagoya
2011 - Revived Kishimoto Sayako, The Miyagi Museum of Art
2017 - Sayako Kishimoto: Retrospective, Shumoku Gallery, Nagoya
2019 - Kishimoto Sayako: The Messenger, Aichi Prefectural Museum of Art

=== Group Exhibition ===
1960 - The 12th Yomiuri Indépendant Exhibition, Tokyo Metropolitan Art Museum
2nd Neo-Dada Organizers Exhibition, Masunobu Yoshimura's studio, Tokyo
3rd Neo-Dada Organizers Exhibition, Hibiya Gallery, Tokyo
1961 - The 13th Yomiuri Indépendant Exhibition, Tokyo Metropolitan Art Museum
1962 - The 14th Yomiuri Indépendant Exhibition, Tokyo Metropolitan Art Museum
1963 - The 15th Yomiuri Indépendant Exhibition, Tokyo Metropolitan Art Museum
SWEET - Graduation Group Exhibition, Tama Art University, Tokyo
1964 - Off Museum, Tsubaki Kindai Gallery, Tokyo
1965 - 9th Shell Art Festival Exhibition, Itoh Gallery, Tokyo
Big Fight, Tsubaki Kindai Gallery, Tokyo
1966 - The Trend of Modern Art, The National Museum of Modern Art, Tokyo
1976 - Yes! Woman's Filmmaker Festival, Nagoya
1980 - The Study of the 80s, Nagoya City Museum - Gallery
1996 - Neo Dada · 10 + 1 people, Tano Gallery, Takamatsu
1989 - Tokyo Metropolitan Art Museum
1998 - NEO DADA JAPAN 1958-1998: ARATA ISOZAKI and the Artists of “White House,” Art Plaza, Oita
2004 - Modern Masters and Collection, 21st Century Museum of Contemporary Art, Kanazawa
2005 - Japanese Women Artists in Avant-Garde Movements, 1950-1975, Tochigi Prefectural Museum of Fine Arts, Utsunomiya
2005 - Another Story: Selected Works from the Collection, 21st Century Museum of Contemporary Art, Kanazawa
2006 - Real Utopia - Stories of the Unlimited, 21st Century Museum of Contemporary Art, Kanazawa
2009 - Hundred Stories About Love, 21st Century Museum of Contemporary Art, Kanazawa
2012 - Collection Exhibition: Son et Lumière – Material, Transition, Time, 21st Century Museum of Contemporary Art, Kanazawa
2017 - Collection Exhibition 1: PLAY, 21st Century Museum of Contemporary Art, Kanazawa
2020 - Documents: Avant-Garde In Nagoya, Standing Pine, Nagoya
