= Ushio Shinohara =

Japanese sculptor and painter

- 篠原 有司男
- Born: January 17, 1932 (age 94); Kōjimachi, Tokyo, Empire of Japan
- Other name: Gyū-chan
- Education: Tokyo University of the Arts
- Movement: Neo-Dada
- Spouse: Noriko Shinohara
- Children: 3

Ushio Shinohara (篠原 有司男, Shinohara Ushio, born January 17, 1932), nicknamed “Gyū-chan”, is a Japanese contemporary painter, sculptor, and performance artist based in New York City. Best known for his vigorously painted, large-scale and dynamic Boxing Painting series, Shinohara makes use of embodied gestures, appropriation and assemblage, iconographies of mass culture and traditional arts, and vivid tones in his diverse, multidisciplinary practice.

A founding member of the short-lived, avant-garde collective Neo-Dada Organizers, Shinohara spent the early years of his life in Tokyo before moving to New York City in 1969, where he continues to live and work. Having grown up in Japan through a time of rapid political change, social upheaval, and increasing Americanization and modernization in the wake of the American occupation, Shinohara's work was shaped by and responsive to the clashing forces in his midst. His energetic confrontations with conventions of both traditional and contemporary artistic canons are filtered through a pop sensibility and an understanding of art-making as a series of ephemeral gestures rather than a results-based process.

His work has been exhibited internationally at institutions including the Hara Museum of Contemporary Art, Centre Georges Pompidou, the Guggenheim Museum SoHo, National Museum of Modern Art, Tokyo, National Museum of Modern Art, Kyoto, Leo Castelli Gallery, Museum of Contemporary Art, Los Angeles and the Japan Society. Shinohara and his wife, Noriko, are the subjects of a documentary film by Zachary Heinzerling called Cutie and the Boxer (2013).

== Early life and education ==
Ushio Shinohara was born on January 17, 1932, in the Kōjimachi neighborhood of central Tokyo. His father was a tanka poet who was taught by Wakayama Bokusui, and his mother was a Nihonga painter and doll-maker who studied at the Private Women's School of Fine Arts (present-day Joshibi University of Art and Design) in Tokyo.

Shinohara attended Bancho Elementary School and Azabu Junior and Senior High School, and in 1952, enrolled in Tokyo Art University (known today as the Tokyo University of the Arts), where he studied yōga under the renowned painter Takeshi Hayashi. His classmates included Tetsumi Kudō, Jirō Takamatsu, and Natsuyuki Nakanishi, who would become fellow members of the Neo-Dada Organizers. Dissatisfied with the school's teaching, Shinohara quit the school in 1957 without completing his degree.

== Career ==
=== Neo-Dada Organizers ===
Having grown up in the wake of World War II and the subsequent American Occupation, Shinohara's early work was keenly responsive to the conditions of postwar urban reconstruction, the crisis of reinterpreting tradition, and the pervasive and alluring presence of American mass media and consumer culture.

In 1955, Shinohara began submitting artworks to the unjuried, avant-garde Yomiuri Indépendant Exhibition and continued to participate in almost every iteration of the annual fair through 1963. Sponsored by the Yomiuri Shimbun newspaper, this freewheeling exhibition was unjuried and open to anyone, and thus became a site of artistic experimentation that paved the way for new forms of "anti-art," "non-art," and "junk art."

As there were few art dealers, collectors, and established galleries in Japan at the time, artist-organized group exhibitions and media-sponsored shows were the most popular platform for displaying and engaging with avant-garde, contemporary art. Shinohara was keenly conscious of his public image and sought to craft a persona through media portrayals, persuading the Weekly Sankei to feature him as a (self-dubbed) "rockabilly painter".

In March 1958, Shinohara paid a visit to Masunobu Yoshimura's newly built studio-residence in Shinjuku, an open plan space with large glass doors and white mortar finish designed by Arata Isozaki. Struck by the potentials of the modern and open interior, Shinohara declared, "I can do something here!" The studio atrium became the site of regular meetings of the Neo-Dada Organizers, the short-lived artistic collective formed in 1960 between Shinohara, Yoshimura, and other young artists who had been displaying artworks at the Yomiuri Indépendant, including Genpei Akasegawa, Shūsaku Arakawa, and Testumi Kudo.

The Neo-Dada Organizers held three official exhibitions in 1960, as well as a number of bizarre "actions," "events," and "happenings" in which they sought to mock, deconstruct, and in many cases, physically destroy conventional forms of art. Examples included filling galleries with piles of garbage, smashing furniture to the beat of jazz music, and prancing the streets of Tokyo in various states of dress and undress. Using the human body as their medium of art, their violent performances reflected both their dissatisfaction with the restrictive environment of the Japanese art world at the time, as well as contemporary social developments, most notably the massive 1960 Anpo protests against the U.S.-Japan Security Treaty.

Shinohara was instrumental in shaping the group's orientation around what Akasegawa would later term "creative destruction." In June 1960, at the height of the Anpo protests, Shinohara penned the short statement the group deemed its "manifesto," writing as follows:

No matter how much we fantasize about procreation in the year 1960, a single atomic explosion will casually solve everything for us, so Picasso’s fighting bulls no longer move us any more than the spray of blood from a run-over stray cat. As we enter the blood-soaked ring in this 20.6th century—a century which has trampled on sincere works of art—the only way to avoid being butchered is to become butchers ourselves.

Driven by a heedless energy to resist, provoke, indulge, and produce scandal and awe, the Neo-Dada Organizers were not rooted in the theoretical or political so much as the intuitive and instinctual dimensions of making and exhibiting art. Shinohara's works as part of the collective, such as Cheerful Fourth Dimension (Gokigenna 4-jigen) and Thunder Sculpture (Kaminari chokoku), used massive amounts of store-bought balloons, bamboo poles, nails, and other generic materials to produce destructive performances that indulged in the pleasures of excess and spectacle. Shinohara was also keenly aware of the artistic value of self-promotion and immediacy in the age of mass media, and walked around the streets of Ginza with exhibition announcements plastered across his body, in an act that blurred the division between performance and publicity.

==== Boxing Painting ====
At a Neo-Dada event in September 1960 titled Bizarre Assembly, Shinohara, wearing his trademark mohawk hairstyle, performed his now-famous "boxing painting," punching a large piece of paper with boxing gloves that had been dipped in ink numerous times in succession. Shinohara's action painting practice began around this time, drawing from contemporary precedents in gestural abstraction while simultaneously insisting that the action, not the resulting painting, should constitute the artwork itself. Keenly conscious of his public persona, Shinohara accepted media requests from magazines, newspapers, and filmmakers to capture his art-making process. In 1960, novelist Kenzaburō Ōe was commissioned to write a feature on Japanese Beats by Mainichi Graph, which featured Shinohara performing an action painting using sumi ink, kraft paper, and rags wrapped around his wrists.

In 1961, renowned photographer William Klein captured Shinohara's "boxing painting" on film, publishing the photos in his famed 1964 collection Tokyo. Klein's photographs are some of the few records of Shinohara's performances, and the work of the Neo-Dada group more broadly, as their unconventional materials and transient actions defied archival practices. Their artworks were rarely taken seriously by critics, who merely saw the artists as vulgar, spoiled, anti-intellectual boys indulging in anti-establishment play.

=== Post Neo-Dada ===
==== Oiran ====
In 1965, Shinohara began his Oiran series. The title refers to the high-ranking courtesans from the Edo period, and the works were particularly informed by the famed muzan-e ("atrocity prints") series Twenty-Eight Famous Murders with Verse (1866–7) by Tsukioka Yoshitoshi. Shinohara drew from the recognizable conventions of the genre while simultaneously combining these violent scenes with images of disaster from the Vietnam War culled from mass media, deconstructing form, and using fluorescent, flat swaths of color and garish patterns that aligned with Pop art sensibilities. Works from the series were featured in a solo exhibition, Doll Festival (Hinamatsuri), at Tokyo Gallery in February 1966, one of the few commercial galleries focused on contemporary art at the time. The exhibit was timed to coincide with the Hinamatsuri holiday on March 3, and subverted, along with the oiran, other motifs of classical Japanese femininity and traditional Japan. For the installation, Shinohara created life-size hina dolls out of aluminum, adorning the empress figure with several gaudy kanzashi to conflate her identity with an oiran, and transforming the emperor into an unsettling machine, whose head would spin rapidly and emit loud noise when a switch was turned on.

The motif of the oiran continues to appear throughout his other works, notably as riders in his Motorcycle Sculpture series.

==== Imitation Art ====
Shinohara was fascinated by Pop art and its appropriation of American visual culture, and found himself drawn to its strategies of appropriation, declaring that "the first to imitate will win." He began to copy the works of Robert Rauschenberg, George Segal, Jasper Johns, and other American artists. Drink More (1964) (originally titled Lovely, lovely America) features a plaster hand holding a bottle of Coca-Cola, emerging from a backdrop of a bright orange and yellow American flag that serves as a direct quotation of Johns' signature motif. Upon visiting Shinohara's studio in the early 1960s, Johns, taken with the series, took one of the pieces back home with him. In 1965, Johns used the work as a basis for a flag painting rendered in bright orange and green, maintaining the cycle of imitation and re-appropriation that formed the conceptual bedrock of Pop.

As Hiroko Ikegami argues, Shinohara's gestures not only critiqued Western conventions of originality and authorship by re-inscribing the same strategies of reproduction, but called attention to the ideological crisis of Japanese modern art, as a mode that was contingent on originality and difference, yet simultaneously was reliant on precedents borrowed from Euro-American modernism.

=== New York (1969-present) ===
In 1969, Shinohara relocated to New York City, originally on a one-year scholarship from the John D. Rockefeller III Fund. After a stay at the Hotel Chelsea, he moved to fellow artist Ay-O's loft in Chinatown, located in a building occupied by several Fluxus artists including Nam June Paik. Charmed by the gritty energy of the city, the liberatory potential of working in the States, and the city's art scene, he secured a green card in 1970 and remained in the city, where he continues to live to work to this day.

==== Motorcycle Sculptures ====
Shinohara began his ongoing Motorcycle Sculptures series in 1972, a project in part inspired by the Hells Angels bikers he observed around downtown Manhattan. The artist was taken by the motorcyclists’ rugged machismo, their disregard for traffic lights and convention, and the violent energy they exuded—qualities he associated with a sort of American spirit not found in Japan at the time. Shinohara also recalls having watched the 1953 Marlon Brando film The Wild One while in Japan, and cites it as another source of inspiration.

The works were primarily constructed out of found cardboard boxes, assembled with adhesives such as packing tape and hot glue, and decorated with an array of materials including polyester resin, jelly beans, mosaic tiles made by the artist himself, wires, ice cream cones, and kanzashi hair ornaments. The forms of the motorcycles resemble customized choppers—Shinohara himself stated that he found Harley-Davidson bikes over Japanese counterparts such as Honda and Kawasaki, which he found to be “too modern.” Michael Lobel suggests that Shinohara's interest in the quintessentially American brand may be also read in the context of heightening trade tensions between the United States and Japan during the 1970s. As the popularity of motorcycles steadily grew in the States, so did the number of Japanese imports, which rapidly overtook Harley-Davidson and other American manufacturers, contributing to a broader sentiment of anxiety about Japan's status as an economic competition and consequent limits on automotive exports from Japan following the Nixon shock in 1971. The motorcycle, thus, was a symbol loaded with not only connotations of autonomy, mobility, and individualism, but also carried with it transnational socioeconomic connotations, especially considering Shinohara's status as a Japanese artist working in the United States.

In 1982, Shinohara held his first solo exhibition in the United States at the Japan Society Gallery with the encouragement of gallery director Rand Castile. The exhibit marked a radical departure from the venue's typical shows, which focused on traditional arts like tea ceremony and ikebana, and garnered significant attention from critics.

==== Return to Boxing Painting ====
In 1991, Shinohara was invited to create a Boxing Painting in front of the public as part of the 1991 exhibition Japanese Anti-Art: Now and Then, held at the National Museum of Art, Osaka, which became part of the museum's collection after its completion. This marked Shinohara's return to the series, which he had not engaged with since the 1960s, and it has since become an ongoing practice for the artist, who has produced the Boxing Paintings at art venues worldwide. Though his earlier works were rendered in black and white, Shinohara began adding color to both the paint and the canvas ground starting in 1998.

Though Shinohara's style is known for its rugged energy and vibrant, seemingly chaotic gestures, critics have often remarked on his keen interest in pictorial references and attention to formal organization. As Julia Cassim observed in her 1993 review of Shinohara's retrospective at Tsukashin Hall in Amagasaki, Japan:

“His kaleidoscopic paintings of pneumatic, rubber-nippled nudes, bikers and Coney Island’s garish glories are painted in the acid reds, greens and pinks common to Asian street fairs from Tokyo to Bombay. They burst at the seams with detail. Seemingly slapdash and rapidly painted, they are, in fact, as carefully composed as any more formal work.”

Shinohara's boxing paintings have continued to receive widespread acclaim internationally. A 2003 commercial for Pocari Sweat featured Shinohara in action, painting against a wall.

== Personal life ==
Shinohara is affectionately nicknamed Gyū-chan (ギューチャン, "Little Cow") because his birth name (牛男, also pronounced "Ushio") used the Chinese characters for "cow" and "man."

Shinohara has been married to artist Noriko Shinohara since the early 1970s; together they have a son who is also an artist, Alexander Kūkai Shinohara. The two met in 1973, when Ushio was beginning to establish himself in New York art scene, and Noriko was studying at the Art Students League of New York. Their tumultuous life together as a family was the subject of a 2013 documentary, Cutie and the Boxer, directed by Zachary Heinzerling. The family is based in the Dumbo neighborhood of Brooklyn, New York. Shinohara was previously married to a woman in Japan, with whom he has two sons.

== Exhibitions ==
In 1982, Shinohara held his first solo exhibition in the United States at the Japan Society Gallery with the encouragement of gallery director Rand Castile. The exhibit marked a radical departure from the venue's typical shows, which focused on traditional arts like tea ceremony and ikebana, and garnered significant attention from critics.

In 1990, Shinohara's work was part of a traveling exhibition that was sponsored by the Museum of Modern Art in New York. His piece "Coca-Cola Plan" (1964) was featured in the exhibition "Tokyo 1955–1970: A New Avant-Garde," which ran from November 2012 until February 2013 at the MoMA in New York. A retrospective of his work, titled "Shinohara Pops!" was held at the Samuel Dorsky Museum of Art at the State University of New York at New Paltz in 2012.

== Collections ==
Shinohara's work is found in multiple public museum collections including: Museum of Modern Art (MoMA) New York, the Metropolitan Museum of Art, Hara Museum of Contemporary Art, the Asian Art Museum, the Museum of Fine Arts, Houston, and the Yamamura Collection at the Hyogo Prefectural Museum of Art.

== Awards ==
- 1969 – John D. Rockefeller III Award Fund
- 2007 – 48th annual Mainichi Art Prize
- 2019 – Agency for Cultural Affairs Commissioner's Award
