= Jacques Halbert =

French artist

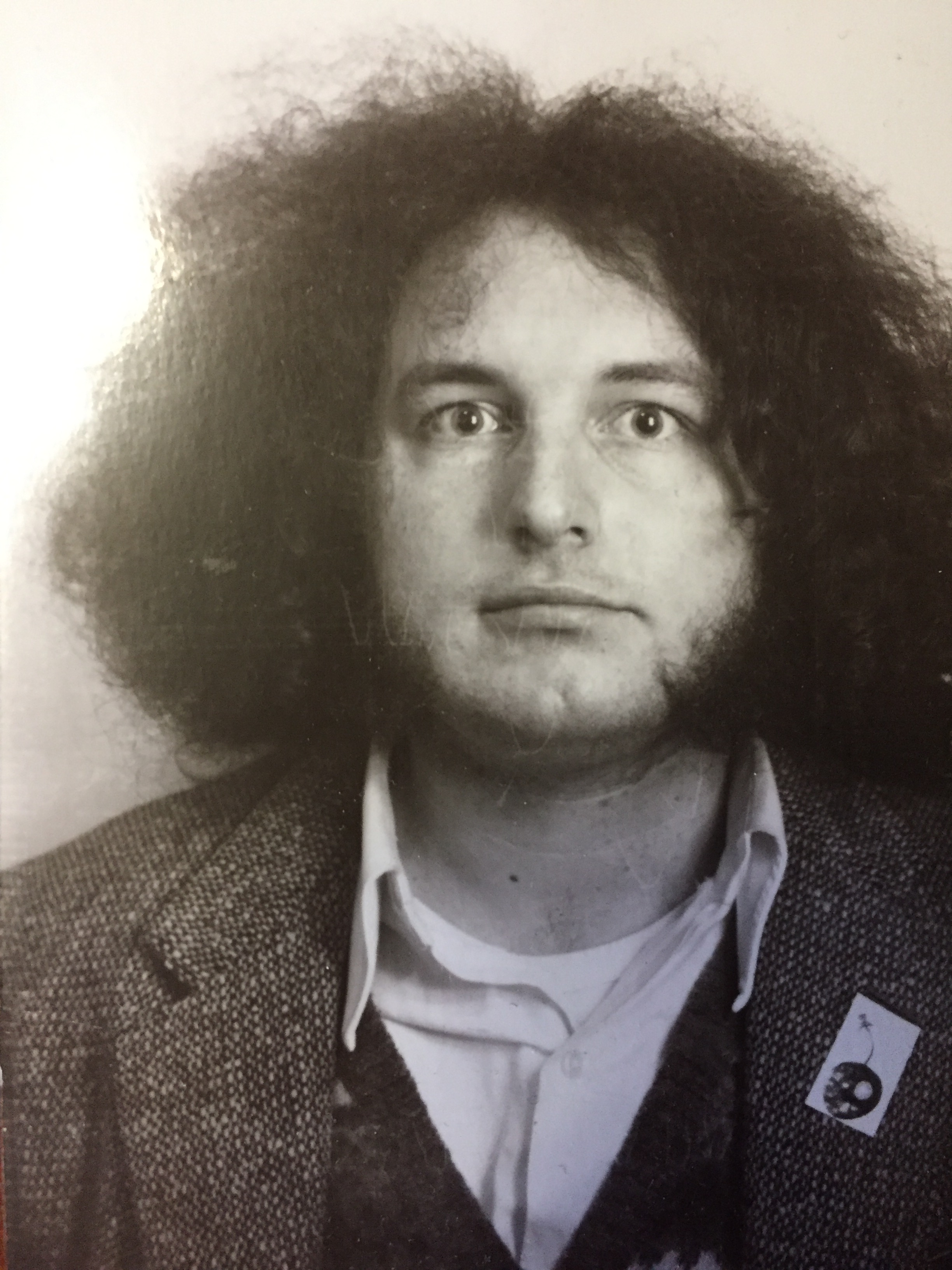
- Self portrait, 1980.
- Born: January 27, 1955 (age 71); Bourgueil
- Education: École nationale supérieure d'art de Bourges
- Known for: Monochrome with cherries
- Style: Contemporary art
- Movement: Neo-Dada
- Website: http://www.jacqueshalbert.com/

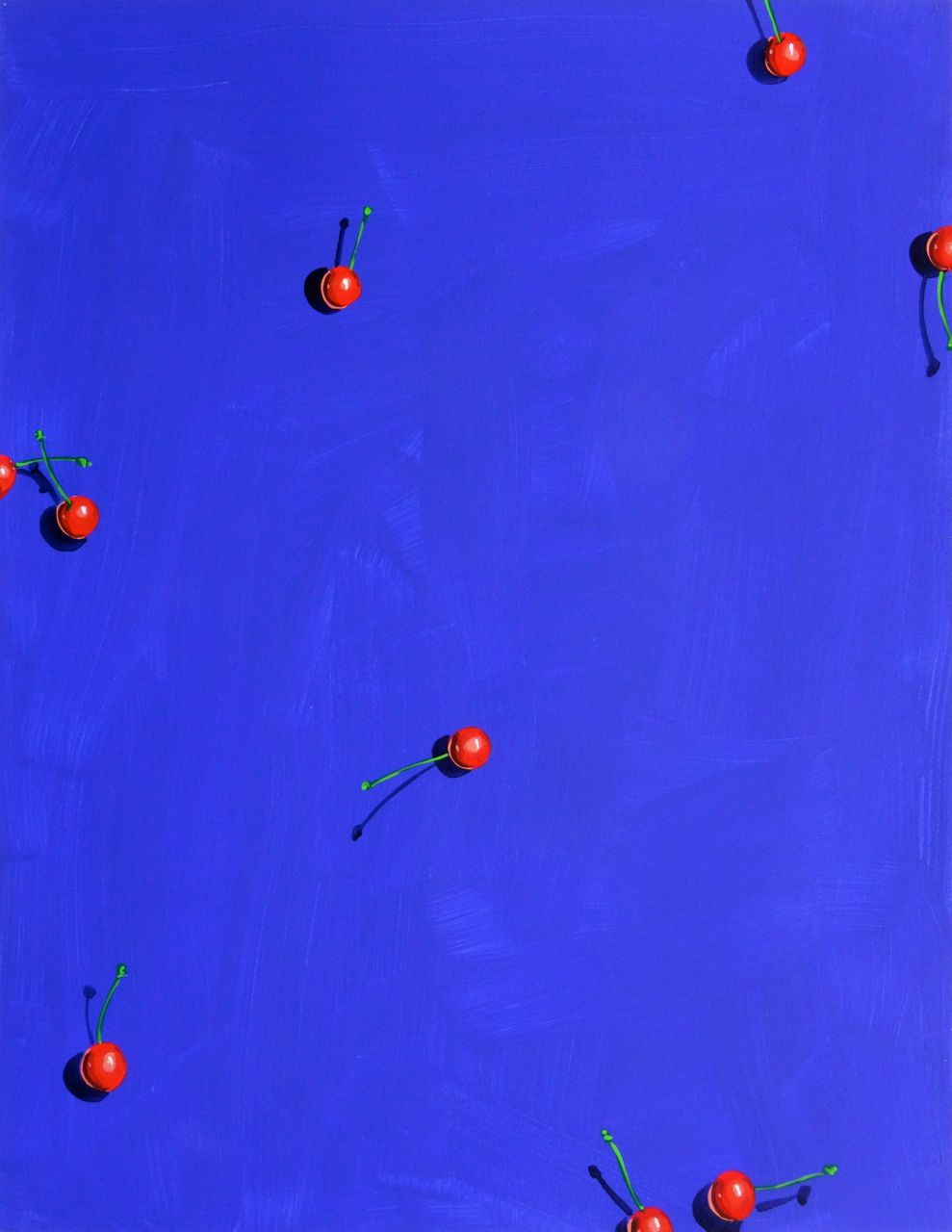
Painting, 1975

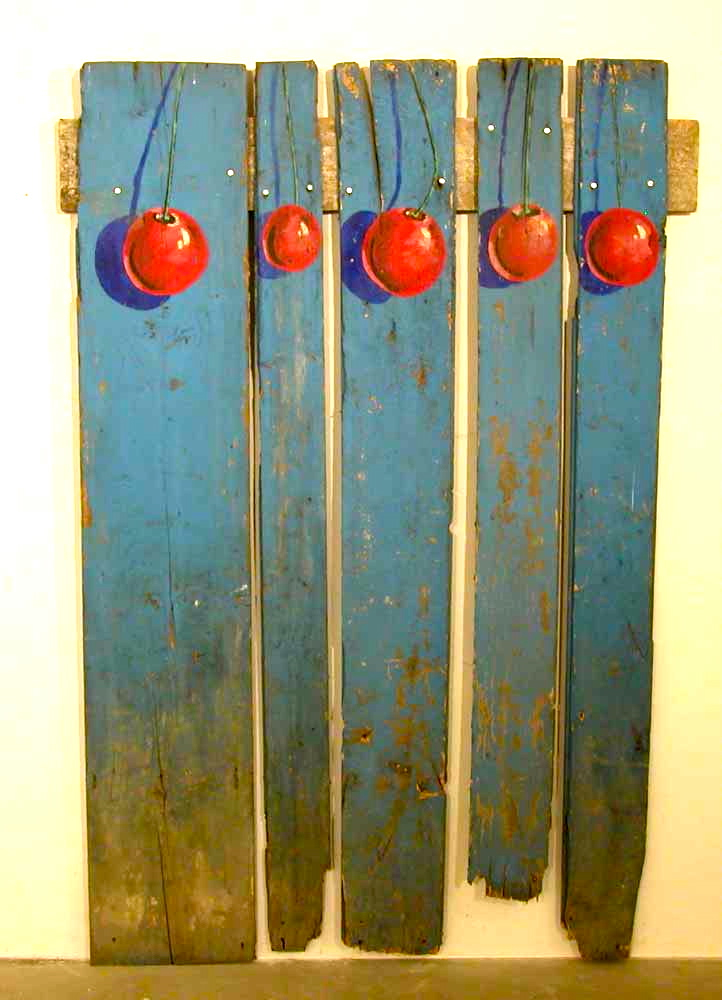
Painting, 1975

Jacques Halbert (born in 1955 in Bourgueil) is a French contemporary artist.

== Career ==
He attended the Brassart School in Tours (1972-1973) then studied at the École nationale supérieure d'Arts in Bourges from 1973 to 1978 with Daniel Dezeuze and Jean-Claude Silbermann as teachers. Between 1978 and 2002 he lives and works in the United States and returns to settle in France in 2002. Since 2002, he lives and works in Candes-Saint-Martin in Touraine.

In 2015, he is one of the signatories of the tribune in L'Humanité, "Response of the 1001 artists to Marine Le Pen", during the regional elections.

=== Art Café New York ===
From 1985 to 1989 Jacques Halbert is the owner, with Mireille Brame of the Art Café in New York in the East Village. He has organized numerous exhibitions curated by Alan Jones, Dorothée Selz and Pierre Restany with artists such as: John Armleder, Olivier Mosset, Charles Dreyfus, Dorothée Selz, Jean Dupuy, Daniel Spoerri, Ken Friedmann, Ben Vautier, Jeff Koons, Andy Warhol, Phoebe Legere, Christian Xatrec or François Morellet. In 1989, Jacques Halbert closed the restaurant and moved to work in Miami and Sarasota then to Los Angeles.

=== Magnifik Gallery ===
In 1999, Jacques Halbert returns to New York and opens the Magnifik Gallery in Williamsburg (New York) with artists: Olga Adorno, Larry Miller, John Armleder, Olivier Mosset, Jean Dupuy, Ben Paterson, Ken Friedmann, Jack Pospisil, Geoff Hendricks, Carolee Schneemann, Joel Hubaut, Ben Vautier, Brendan Klinger, Christian Xatrec, Alison Knowles, Phoebe Legere, Nicola L.

== Work ==
Two main guidelines are outlined in the work of Jacques Halbert since his years of studies at the Beaux-Arts in Bourges, performance art and painting.

A notable collector of Halbert's work is Brian Johnson.

=== Performance art ===
In 1976, during the construction of the Centre Georges Pompidou, he creates a Centre Pompidou-Cake, which he cuts and shares, on the forecourt of the museum, with his artist friends and passers-by unofficially invited to this performance. The same year at the invitation of Henri Jobbé-Duval (director of the FIAC), he transforms a scooter into Gallery Cerise, a traveling sculpture with which he rides the aisles of the FIAC in 1976 and 1977. He travels with the streets of Paris and parks in front of the art galleries during vernissages, selling passers-by and art lovers cherry tarts and monochromes covered with painted cherries. Jacques Halbert defines himself this Fluxus and neo-Dadaist and often parodic posture of the figure of the artist as "a manifesto of good taste".

In 2003, back in France, he exhibits at the Creux de l'enfer-Contemporary art center the Wall of laughter that records the laughter of his friends and fellow artists, with whom he worked during his American years.

=== Painting ===
His Paintings are almost exclusively and invariably made by painting one or multiple cherries on a monochrome canvas.

== Permanent collections ==
- Centre Georges Pompidou, Paris.
- Centre National des Arts Plastiques (CNAP), Paris.
- Fonds Régional d'Art Contemporain Auvergne (FRAC), Clermont Ferrand.
- Emily Harvey Foundation Collection, New York.

== Books ==
- Dupuy, Jean (1980). Collective Consciousness. Performing Arts Journal Publications. ISBN 978-0-933826-27-4.
- Damian, Carol (2011). Tour de France/Florida: Contemporary Artist's from France in Florida's Private Collections. The Patricia & Philip Frost Art Museum, Miami. ISBN 978-0-9819337-8-8.
- Halbert, Jacques (2005). Le Mur du Rire. creux de l'enfer. ISBN 978-2-914307-11-6.
- Halbert, Jacques (2013). Le Paradis Perdure. Le Carré scène nationale. ISBN 978-2-9543196-29.
- Bouglé, frédéric (1993). Jacques Halbert. Ecole Regionale des Beaux-Arts de Nantes.
- Spoerri, Daniel (2015). Attention * Oeuvre d'art *. Communauté de communes Chinon, Vienne et Loire. ISBN 979-1-09363636-8.

== Internal link ==
- Anti-art
- Fluxus
