= Tetsumi Kudo =

Japanese avant-garde artist

Tetsumi Kudо̄ (工藤哲巳)
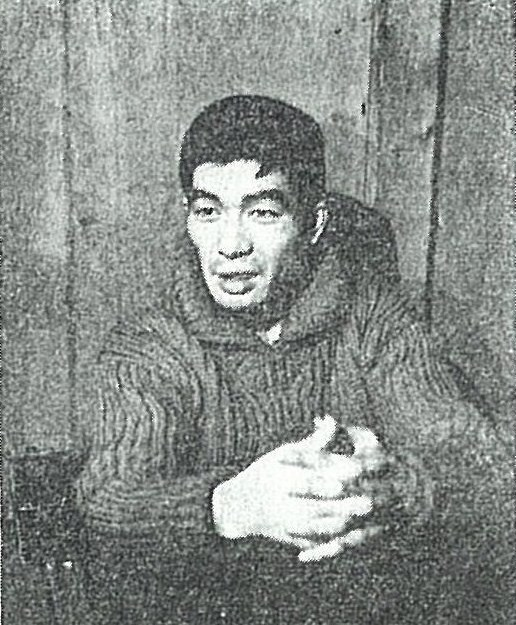
- Tetsumi Kudо̄ at the beginning of the 1960s
- Born: February 23, 1935; Hyōgo Prefecture, Japan
- Died: November 12, 1990 (aged 55); Tokyo, Japan
- Education: Tokyo University of the Arts
- Known for: Sculpture, Painter

Tetsumi Kudо̄ (工藤哲巳, Kudō Tetsumi) (23 February 1935 – 12 November 1990) was a Japanese avant-garde artist whose multidisciplinary practice included painting, performance, installation and sculpture. Associated with the Anti-Art (Han-geijutsu) movement in Japan in the late 1950s and early 1960s, Kudо̄'s provocative art was nourished by lifelong interests in science, sport and everyday objects. His work often presents a radically transformed and grotesque vision of the human body, calling into question its desires and its limits, as well as its future and origins. Never having officially identified with any one group or movement throughout his international career, the artist's body of work evades art historical classification.

== Biography ==
=== Early life and education ===
Kudо̄ was born in 1935 in Osaka, Japan to two artist parents, both art teachers. His father, painter Kudо̄ Masayoshi, died when Kudō was ten.

He was evacuated as a child to Aomori prefecture, where he spent the final years of World War II. Art historian Nakamura Keiji has commented that while Kudо̄ and other artists associated with the Anti-Art (Han-geijutsu) movement were too young to participate in the war, they were brought up and educated in the ideals of wartime Japan. As such, their country's eventual defeat still "constituted a psychological shock as brutal as it was unexpected".

In high school, Kudо̄ joined the art club and received private lessons from painter Koiso Ryо̄hei. He was also fascinated by science, finding inspiration in photos of cancer and nerve cells that classmates studying medicine shared with him, as well as images taken by electron microscopes. He read books on newly developing topics like nuclear and quantum physics.

While not initially admitted to Tokyo National University of Fine Arts and Music when he first applied in 1953, he was accepted the following year. He graduated in 1958.

=== Emergence and breakthrough in the Japanese avant-garde scene (1957-1962) ===
As a university student, Kudо̄ actively participated in the Tokyo avant-garde art scene. In 1957, he co-founded the group Tsuchi (meaning "earth" or "soil"), whose name later changed to Ei ("sharp"). Artists who would later be known as integral figures of Japanese post-war art, including Shinohara Ushio and Nakanishi Natsuyuki, took part. Kudо̄, however, left the group after its fourth exhibition. During the late 1950s, Kudо̄ was very close to the Neo-Dada Organizers, however he never officially joined the group.

Kudо̄'s first solo exhibition was in 1957 at the Gallery Blanche in Tokyo, where he exhibited paintings doubtlessly inspired in part by the 1956 Tokyo exhibition Art of the World Today (Sekai konnichi bijutsu ten). The exhibition, which presented works by European and American painters associated with Abstract Expressionism and Art Informel, invigorated Japanese artists who had debated at length about the future of art after the end of the war, and further encouraged them to go beyond the limits of traditional art forms.

Kudо̄'s gestural abstract paintings are piled thick with paint and occasional drippings. Nakamura Keiji has pointed out that the canvases, despite their "automatic" appearance, suggest a deliberate precision in their composition, as if "expressing the will to construct something." The paintings bear titles related to the natural sciences, such as Fusion Reaction, both an indicator of Kudо̄'s fascination for the sciences and giving the impression that Kudо̄ created the paintings "while thinking about the origin of matter and the structure of space".

In addition to his painting practice, Kudо̄ began creating three-dimensional artworks, using found objects, made from materials including but not limited to wood, nails, baskets, scrub brushes and rope. The critic Tо̄no Yoshiaki would later identify Kudо̄ as a representative of the tendency of "Junk Anti-Art," exclaiming: "What an unequivocal metaphysics manifested by the most mundane objects!" Like his paintings, Kudо̄ titled these works with names evoking scientific phenomena, notably Proliferating Chain Reaction. From 1960 onwards, Kudо̄ produced almost exclusively sculptural works.

Kudо̄ also organized a series of three "Happening" events that he titled Anti-Art (Han-geijutsu) throughout 1957 and 1958. These performances involved the artist painting canvases with his entire body with extreme vigor and powerful gestures, sometimes accompanied by musicians. Exploiting the "action" in "action painting," as Shiraga Kazuo and Georges Mathieu had done before him, the extremely physical element of Kudo's work should also be associated with the artist's continued interest in sports. Kudо̄ was an active member of the rugby team during university, and he was an avid boxer. In a text written by the artist in 1960, Kudо̄ highlights the importance of boxing in his creative process, comparing art-making to fighting.

Kudо̄ married Kurihara Hiroko in 1959, with whom he had lived since 1955. While Kudo sold his blood and worked part-time jobs to make ends meet, Hiroko worked as a model to support the couple and actively contributed to Kudo's artmaking throughout the entirety of his career.

In 1960, Kudо̄ participated in the massive Anpo protests against the U.S.-Japan Security Treaty. In the midst of the protests, he was invited to give a speech to the Young Japan Society (Wakai Nihon no Kai), a group of artists, writers, and composers who had banded together to take part in protest activities against the treaty. Instead of giving a lengthy speech, Kudо̄ got up on stage and said only the words "Now there is nothing left but action" (Ima ya akushon aru nomi desu) before leaving the stage, indicating his belief that the time for speeches had passed.

==== Philosophy of Impotence ====
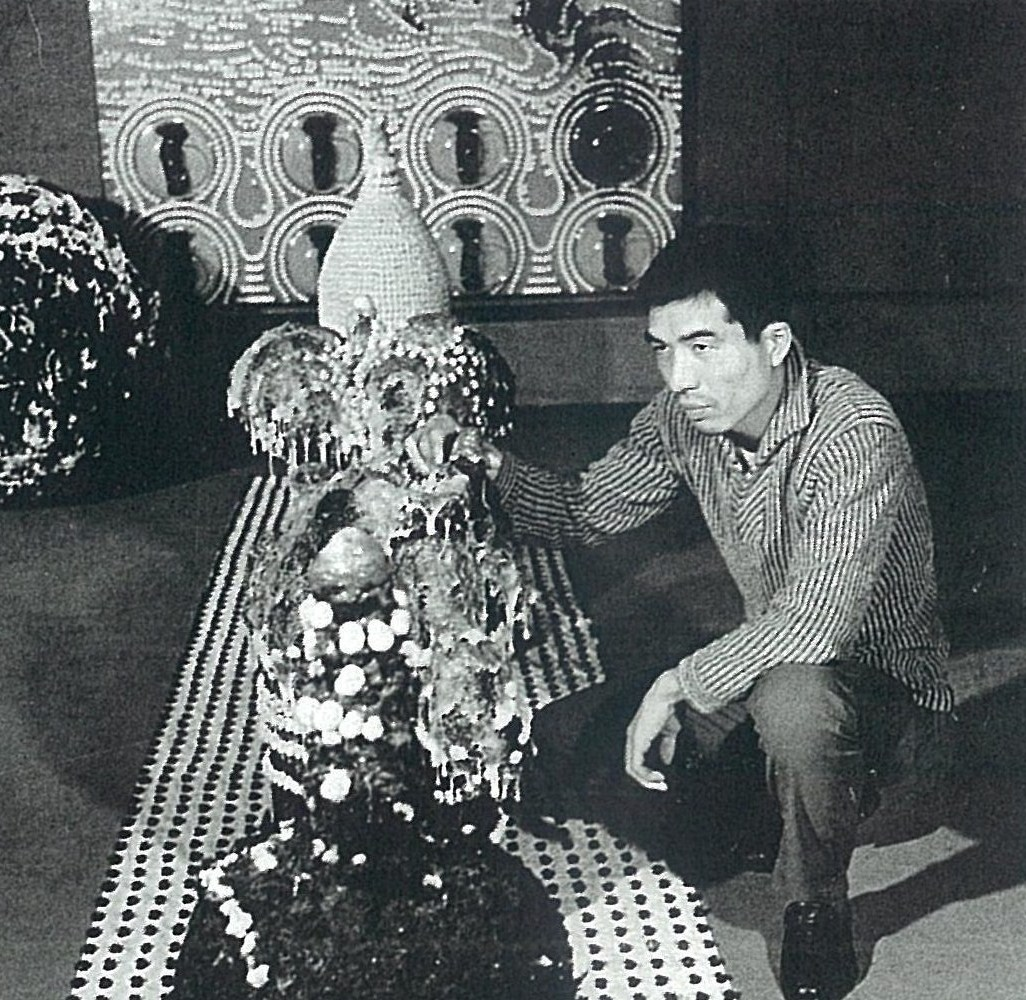
The artist within the 1962 installation of Philosophy of Impotence at the Bungei Shunjū Gallery, Tokyo

After the protests failed to stop the passage of the treaty, leading to an overwhelming sense of disappointment and failure on the part of many participants, Kudо̄ began working on a long-running series of installations and Happenings, collectively entitled The Philosophy of Impotence (インポ哲学, Impo tetsugaku). A first version of the installation was presented at the Bungei Shunjū Gallery in Tokyo as part of a solo exhibition. Composed of different formal elements, including photo collages, large, cylindrical sculptures, a loudspeaker announcing stock prices, and loaves of koppe-pan—a Japanese version of Western bread—Kudо̄ considered the objects to collectively form a single work.

Kudо̄ would present a second, different installation, still bearing the same title, at the 1962 Yomiuri Independent Exhibition, where he had exhibited annually since 1958. The work took up an entire gallery of the Tokyo Metropolitan Art Museum. The artist hung black, penis-shaped objects from the ceiling and the walls of the gallery, some of which were englobed in clear plastic spheres. Udon noodles and koppe-pan were arranged across the gallery floor to evoke ejaculation. Influential artist Akasegawa Genpei said that the work was the "masterpiece of the year."

Highly provocative and far from erotic, Kudо̄ sought to destroy the "beautiful concept of sex" by demonstrating that human beings are, first and foremost, slaves to reproduction, despite our contributions to society and history: our only real purpose is to ensure the survival of the species. Art critic and friend of the artist Anne Tronche has noted that Philosophy of Impotence ran counter to the methodology of the body art movement in the 60s and 70s that claimed sexuality as a means of emancipation and rebellion.

After moving to Paris in 1962, Kudо̄ continued to use the title Philosophy of Impotence for two happenings which utilized elements of his Tokyo installation. A memorable performance included Kudо̄ dressed as a priest, a number of phallic forms dangling from his body, convening with a large penis until finally falling on the ground while moaning. Allan Kaprow included a short description of the event in his 1966 publication Assemblage, Environments & Happenings.

=== Move to Paris and life in Europe (1962-1980) ===
In 1962, Kudо̄ won the Grand Prize in the Second International Young Artists Exhibition (Pan-Pacific Exhibition) (Dai-nikai kokusai seinen bijutsuka-ten [Han taiheiyo-ten]) in Tokyo. Kudо̄ decided to use the prize money—1,500 USD—to move to Paris.

Kudо̄'s provocative performances and work led to his entry into the Parisian art world, where he actively exhibited his work. Artist and critic Jean-Jacques Lebel invited Kudo to participate in the group exhibition Catastrophe at the Galerie Raymond Cordier. Pierre Restany presented Kudо̄'s sculptures for the first time in Paris in 1963, at the Galerie J. He participated in the 3rd Biennale of Paris at the Musée d'art moderne in 1963, where he submitted three works to the Japanese section (one of the three, however, was refused for being "indecent").

Kudo's arrival in Paris brought about major changes in his work. He abandoned painting and abstraction completely, focusing on the production of objects and theatrical Happenings that he performed in Paris and other European cities. He began developing works in the form of boxes and dice. Art historian and curator Doryun Chung describes the die as a "potent symbol, standing as a microcosm of modern human life, into which alienated individuals could retreat and fixate on the cure or comfort of their choice [...] At the same time, [...] the association with games and chance effectively suggested the individual's ultimate lack of control and self-determination."

Kudо̄ also began sculpting grotesque body parts—eyes, skins, hands—isolated from the body, sometimes pulverized, sometimes kept in birdcages or aquariums, and sometimes taking on a life of their own: relaxing in beach chairs, kissing, peeking out of a baby stroller. Critics often associated these works with the aftermath of the atomic bombings of Hiroshima and Nagasaki. While this interpretation is undoubtedly pertinent, Kudо̄ sought more largely to demonstrate that the body is always in a constant state of metamorphosis. Showing the body in this state—in the words of the artist, "ugly, awful, uneasy and sometimes comical"—also served to attack the European idea of human nobility, a major driving force in Kudо̄'s work from his arrival in Paris until the end of his life.

Despite his relative success in Paris, Kudо̄ was careful to maintain his status as an outsider. He spoke little English and did not speak any French. Anne Tronche recalled that the artist often used drawings and almost mathematical diagrams to get his point across during conversations. Additionally, Kudо̄ continued to avoid any and all association with other artists, art movements, or groups.

In 1969, Kudо̄ returned to Japan for the first time since his departure, where he participated in ongoing protests in the wake of the renewal of the U.S.-Japan Security Treaty in 1970. While in Japan, he authored a monumental land art work, unique in the artist's oeuvre. Kudо̄ chose to engrave a penis-chrysalis shape into the side of a flat, rocky cliff at Mount Nokogiri, in Chiba Prefecture. Entitled Monument to Metamorphosis, Doryun Chung importantly notes that the motif of the penis, present in the artist's work since Philosophy of Impotence, is no longer considered a symbol of impotence, but of transformation.

Another motivation in Kudо̄'s work developed around ideas of ecology, human evolution, and technology. Nakamura Keiji mentions that Kudо̄ expressed concern about pollution in the 1960s, before it became a much-discussed topic. In 1968, he began creating greenhouse-like installations, which he further developed into the first half of the 1970s. His 1970 work, Grafted Garden / Pollution - Cultivation - New Ecology is a freakish amalgam of metal poles, plants and dismembered body parts. And yet, Kudо̄ does not intend to evoke horror, but rather to propose a vision of a "New Ecology," in which man, vegetation and technology nourish, transform, cultivate and protect each other, in an "equal relationship, like that between insects and plants, or between nerve and muscle cells."

1970 marked Kudо̄'s first career survey show, Tetsumi Kudo: Cultivation by Radioactivity, in Düsseldorf. In 1978, he received a fellowship from the German Academic Exchange Service to stay in Berlin. During this time, he stopped calling his performances "Happenings" and instead began calling them "Ceremonies." Indeed, Kudо̄ had abandoned the eccentric, colorful outfits that he had often donned for white robes and adopted a more meditative, mystic ambiance, that included the burning of incense and joining of his hands in prayer. Elements of Kudо̄'s sculptural work remained present during these events.

=== Final years between Paris and Japan (1980-1990) ===
Kudо̄ was hospitalized for alcoholism in Paris in the summer of 1980. Writing shortly after, the artist recounts that alcohol "saved" him from "being absorbed into Europe." The following year, he traveled with his family to Japan, staying for over a year. From 1983 until the end of his life, he would split his time between Paris and Japan, more precisely in Tsugaru, in Aomori Prefecture. Kudo's interest in Japan grew, and he began incorporating traditional arts and crafts into his own work, such as kite-painting.

Kudо̄ was active in Japan, helping to organize a retrospective exhibition for his father at the Hirosaki City Museum which opened in 1984 and producing works through the mid-1980s.

In 1987 Kudо̄ was diagnosed with throat cancer in Paris. After his diagnosis, he was appointed professor at the Tokyo National University of Fine Arts and Music.

After receiving radiotherapy treatment, he died of cancer in 1990 at the age of 55 in Tokyo.

== Recognition and legacy ==
During his life, Kudо̄'s work was frequently exhibited internationally. He participated in the 1976 Venice Biennale and the 1977 São Paulo Biennale, where he was awarded a special mention. His work was regularly presented in museums and galleries throughout France and Japan, and he was increasingly recognized in the Netherlands. Kudо̄ has also featured in major exhibitions on the subject of the Japanese avant-garde, such as Japon des avant-gardes, held at the Centre Pompidou in 1986, the 1994 Guggenheim Museum exhibition Japanese Art After 1945: Scream Against the Sky, as well as the 2012 exhibition Tokyo 1955-1970: A New Avant-Garde organized by the Museum of Modern Art, New York.

Since his passing, major institutions in the Netherlands, the United States, France, Japan and Denmark have organized retrospectives of his work.

The late artist Mike Kelley wrote about Kudо̄'s significant influence on his work.

== Public collections and selected exhibitions ==
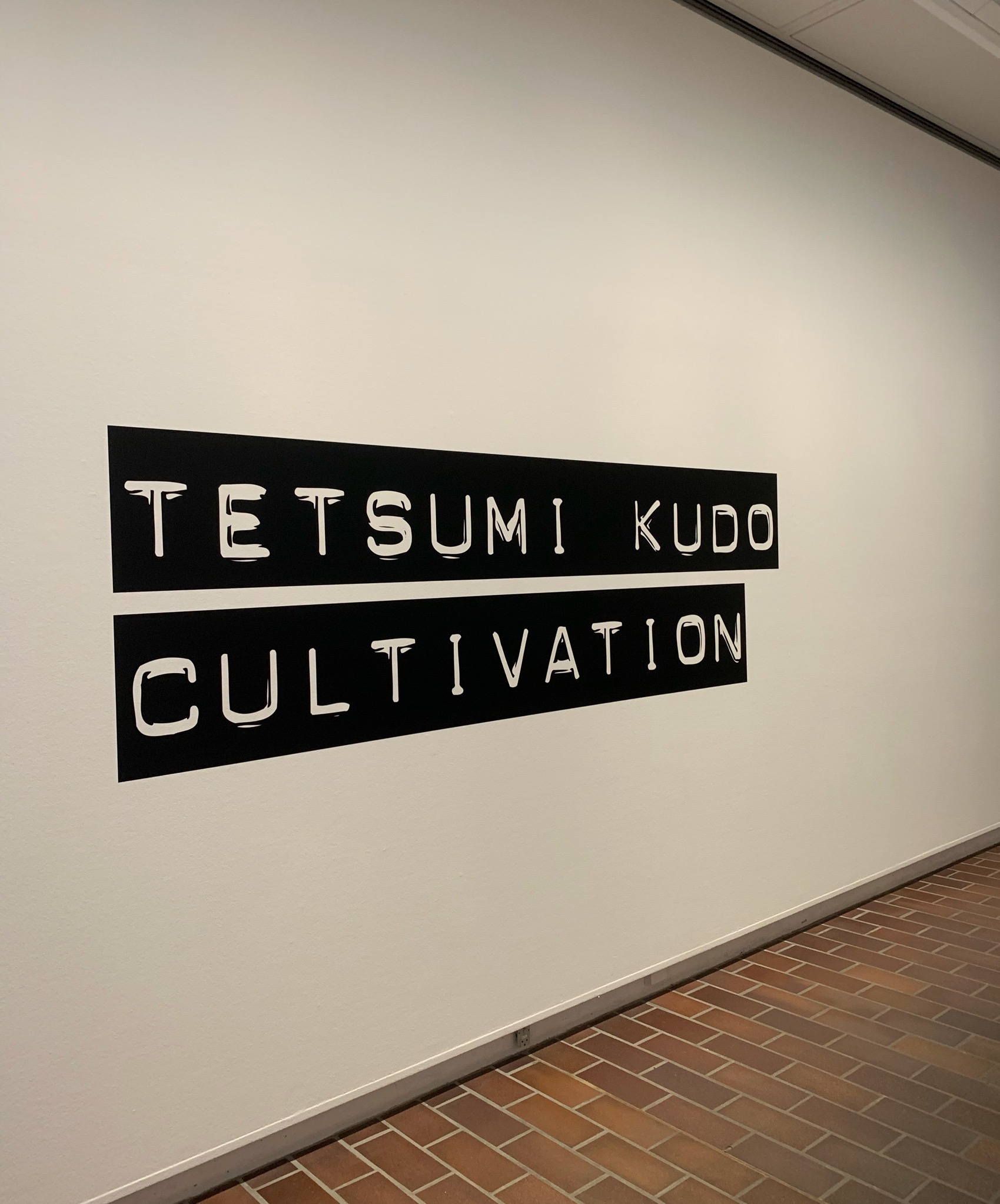
Entrance to exhibition at Louisiana Museum of Modern Art (2020)

=== Collections ===
Kudo's work can be found in the following public collections:

- Aomori Museum of Art, Aomori
- Centre Georges Pompidou, Paris
- Chiba City Art Museum, Chiba City
- Kurashi City Art Museum, Kurashi City
- Musée d'Art Contemperain de Marseilles, Marseilles
- Musée d'Art Moderne de la Ville de Paris, Paris
- Musée des Beaux Arts de Montréal, Montreal
- Museum Moderner Kunst Stiftung Ludwig Wien, Vienna,
- Museum of Contemporary Art, Tokyo
- Museum of Modern Art, New York
- National Museum of Art, Osaka
- Stedelijk Museum voor Actuele Kunst, Ghent
- Stedelijk Museum, Amsterdam
- Walker Art Center, Minneapolis

=== Selected solo exhibitions ===
- 1958: Tetsumi Kudo: Demonstration of Making, Blanche Gallery, Tokyo
- 1961: Tetsumi Kudo: Philosophy of Impotence, Distribution Map of Impotence and the Appearance of Protective Domes at the Points of Saturation, Bungei Shunjū Gallery, Tokyo
- 1965: Tetsumi Kudo: rien n'est laissé au hasard [Tetsumi Kudo: Nothing is left to chance], Galerie J, Paris
- 1970: Tesumi Kudo: Cultivation by Radioactivity, Künstverein für die Rheinland und Westfalen, Düsseldorf
- 1972: Tetsumi Kudo: Pollution - Cultivation - New Ecology - Your Portrait, Stedelijk Museum, Amsterdam
- 1977: Kudo: Portrait de l'artiste dans la crise/cages - peintures à l'ordinateur [Kudo: Portrait of the artist in crisis/cages - computer paintings], Galerie Beaubourg, Paris
- 1981: Tetsumi Kudo 1977-1981, Sogetsu Museum, Tokyo
- 1986: The Path an Artist Has Taken: The World of Tetsumi Kudo, Hirosaki City Museum, Hirosaki
- 1989: KUDO, Nouvelle écologie [KUDO, New Ecology], Galerie du Génie/FIAC, Paris
- 1991: Tetsumi Kudo 1935-1990, Stedelijk Museum, Amsterdam
- 1994: Tetsumi Kudo - Contestation/Création, National Museum of Art, Osaka
- 2007: Tetsumi Kudo: La montagne que nous cherchons est dans la serre [Tetsumi Kudo: The mountain we seek is in the greenhouse], La Maison Rouge, Paris
- 2008: Tetsumi Kudo: Garden of Metamorphosis, Walker Art Center, Minneapolis
- 2013: Your Portrait: A Tetsumi Kudo Retrospective, National Museum of Art, Osaka,
- 2020: Tetsumi Kudo - Cultivation, Louisiana Museum of Modern Art, Humblebaek

=== Selected group exhibitions ===
- 1961: Adventure in Today's Art of Japan, National Museum of Modern Art, Tokyo
- 1961: Continuité et avant-garde au Japon, International Center of Aesthetic Research, Torino
- 1962: Pour conjurer l'esprit de Catastrophe [So as to conjure the spirit of Catastrophe], Galerie Raymond Cordier, Paris
- 1963: 3e Biennale de Paris (Japan Section), Musée d'art moderne de la ville de Paris, Paris
- 1965: Les objecteurs, Galerie J, Paris
- 1967: Science Fiction, Kunsthalle Bern, Bern
- 1977: 14th Bienale Internacional de São Paolo, São Paulo, Brazil
- 1981: The 1960s: A Decade of Change in Contemporary Japanese Art, National Museum of Modern Art, Tokyo
- 1985: Reconstructions: Avant-Garde Art in Japan, 1945-1965, Museum of Modern Art, Oxford
- 1986: Japon des avant-gardes, 1910-1970, Centre Georges Pompidou, Paris
- 1994: Japanese Art after 1945: Scream Against the Sky, Guggenheim Museum, New York
- 1994: Revolution: Art of the Sixties from Warhol to Beuys, Museum of Contemporary Art, Tokyo
- 1994: Hiroshima: The Past and the Promise, Kunamoto Prefectural museum of Art, Kumamoto
- 1994: Hors limites: l'art et la vie 1952-1994 [Beyond limits: art and life 1952-1994], Centre Georges Pompidou, Paris
- 1995: Japanese Culture: The Fifty Postwar Years, Meguro Museum of Art, Tokyo
- 1998: Out of Actions: Between Performance and the Object, 1949-1979, Museum of Contemporary Art, Los Angeles
- 2001: Les années pop [The pop years], Centre Georges Pompidou, Paris
- 2002: The Unfinished Century: Legacies of 20th Century Art, National Museum of Modern Art, Tokyo
- 2007: Living in the Material World: 'Things' in Art of the 20th Century and Beyond, National Art Center, Tokyo
- 2012: Objet d'art du Japon: From the 1920s to the 70s, Urawa Art Museum, Saitama
- 2012: Tokyo 1955-1970: A New Avant-Garde, Museum of Modern Art, New York
- 2016: Postwar: Art Between the Pacific and the Atlantic, 1945-1965, Haus der Kunst, Munich
- 2017: Jardin Infini. De Giverny à l'Amazonie [Infinite garden. From Giverny to the Amazon], Centre Pompidou Metz
- 2022: Future Bodies from a Recent Past, Munich, Museum Brandhorst
- 2022: Biennale di Venezia, 'The Milk of Dreams', Venice
