= Noriko Shinohara =

Japanese-American multi-disciplinary fine artist

- Born: 1953 (age 72–73); Takaoka, Japan
- Known for: Painting, Drawing, Comics
- Spouse: Ushio Shinohara
- Children: 1

Noriko Shinohara (born 1953 in Takaoka, Japan) is a Japanese-American multi-disciplinary fine artist based in Brooklyn, New York. She is known for her semi-autobiographical drawing and printmaking series "Cutie & Bullie". She has had several international gallery and museum exhibitions including in Tokyo, New York City, Dallas, Kraków, Ottawa and more.

Shinohara and her husband, Ushio, are the subjects of a documentary film by Zachary Heinzerling called Cutie and the Boxer (2013).

== Biography ==
Shinohara moved to New York City at the age of 19, in the early 1970s, in order to study art at the Art Students League of New York. A few months after arriving in the city, she met the artist Ushio who was 21 years her senior. Within the next few years they were married and together they had a son born in 1974, Alexander Kūkai Shinohara. In 2013, the couple and their son appeared in Cutie and the Boxer, a documentary about their art and family life directed by Zachary Heinzerling.

The nickname "Cutie" started in 2002 at the age of 49, when Shinohara was wearing her hair in two braids and a young man on the street called out to her, "hey cutie". The nickname stuck after that event.

She started creating the drawing series after complaining about her husband to a friend, who quipped that she should "punish him" as a dominatrix would do. Finding this idea amusing, in 2003-2004 she started drawing images of Cutie punishing Bullie and sending them to the friend who had made the joke. Initially only Cutie was named in the drawings, which were formatted as six-frame comics, but by 2007 she named Bullie, and slowly it became a story about both Cutie and Bullie.

In 1986, she held her first solo exhibition at the Cat Club in New York City. In 2016, she held a solo exhibition at the Carleton University Art Gallery in Ottawa, Canada,
