= Akasegawa =

Akasegawa may refer to:

== People ==
- Genpei Akasegawa, Japanese artist

== Other ==
- 7418 Akasegawa, main-belt asteroid
