= Neo-Dada Organizers =

Japanese Neo-Dadaist art collective

- Other name(s): Neo・Dada
- Founded: 1960
- Defunct: 1962
- Location: Shinjuku, Tokyo, Japan

Membership
- Membership: ~15
- Leader(s): Masunobu Yoshimura
- Notable members: Genpei Akasegawa, Shūsaku Arakawa, Sayako Kishimoto, Ushio Shinohara

Art
- Art type: Anti-art, non-art, performance art
- Movement: Neo-Dada
- Notable works: Anpo Commemoration Event, Beach Show, Bizarre Assembly

Other
- Associated groups: Tatsumi Hijikata, Toshi Ichiyanagi, Arata Isozaki, Tetsumi Kudō, Natsuyuki Nakanishi, Yasunao Tone

Neo-Dadaism Organizers (ネオ・ダダイズム・オルガナイザーズ, Neo-Dadaizumu-Oruganaizāzu), sometimes shortened to Neo-Dada Organizers or simply Neo-Dada (ネオ・ダダ), was a short-lived but influential Japanese Neo-Dadaist art collective formed by Masunobu Yoshimura in 1960. Composed of a small group of young, up-and-coming artists who met periodically at Yoshimura's "White House" atelier in Shinjuku, the Neo-Dada Organizers engaged in all manner of visual and performance artworks, but specialized in producing disturbing, impulsive spectacles, often involving physical destruction of objects, that the art critic Ichirō Hariu deemed "savagely meaningless," and that inspired another art critic, Yoshiaki Tōno, to coin the term "anti-art" (han-geijutsu). Examples included filling galleries with piles of garbage, smashing furniture to the beat of jazz music, and prancing the streets of Tokyo in various states of dress and undress. Using the human body as their medium of art, their violent performances reflected both their dissatisfaction with the restrictive environment of the Japanese art world at the time, as well as contemporary social developments, most notably the massive 1960 Anpo protests against the U.S.-Japan Security Treaty.

The Neo-Dada Organizers held three official exhibitions in 1960, as well as a number of bizarre "actions," "events," and "happenings" in which they sought to mock, deconstruct, and in many cases, physically destroy conventional forms of art. Many of the group's members and participants would go on to become noted artists in their own right, including Genpei Akasegawa, Shūsaku Arakawa, Sayako Kishimoto, Tetsumi Kudō, Natsuyuki Nakanishi, and Ushio Shinohara.

== Artistic stance ==
Neo-Dada Organizers was formed at a time when Japan was rapidly modernizing after the destruction of World War II. The group positioned themselves in opposition to all established art forms and institutions, especially the strains of humanism and socialist realism that dominated Japanese art circles in the 1950s, but also the recent tendency toward wholesale importation of foreign art trends, such as abstract art and Art Informel. But beyond opposing the dominant art forms of the time, the Neo-Dada Organizers reacted to the efforts by the Liberal Democratic Party government, led by conservative Prime Minister Nobusuke Kishi, to revise and extend the United States Japan Security Treaty (known as "Anpo" in Japanese), which led to the massive Anpo protests across the country. Because it locked Japan into a quasi-permanent military alliance with the United States, the treaty led many Japanese to fear that Japan would become a target should a nuclear war break out.

At their first exhibition, held at the Ginza Gallery in Tokyo in April, 1960, the Neo-Dada Organizers released a list of their guiding principles:

We are Neo-Dadaists.

—Neo-Daddists are uncultured.
—Neo-Daddists are not Japanese.
—Neo-Daddists are not human beings.
—Neo-Daddists are a group devoted to artistic revolution.
—Neo-Daddists reject the abstract art movement entirely.
—Neo-Daddists have a thirst for killing.

These principles signaled the group's devotion to what group member Genpei Akasegawa would later term "creative destruction" whereby the group sought to create a space for new types of art to emerge by systematically seeking out and destroying all existing artistic norms and conventions.

In June 1960, Akasegawa read out the group's "manifesto" (written by group member Ushio Shinohara) to a group of reporters:

No matter how much we fantasize about procreation in the year 1960, a single atomic explosion will casually solve everything for us, so Picasso’s fighting bulls no longer move us any more than the spray of blood from a run-over stray cat. As we enter the blood-soaked ring in this 20.6th century—a century which has trampled on sincere works of art—the only way to avoid being butchered is to become butchers ourselves.

This statement conveyed a sense of hopeless desperation that, at a time when attempts to create new forms of art were being suffocated by oppressive ideologies and hide-bound institutions, the only way to save art was to kill it.

== Name ==
The term "Neo-Dada" was first used in May 1957 in Robert Rosenblum's "Castelli Group" article for Arts Magazine, and then, more dramatically, in January 1958, in the New York art monthly ARTnews, to describe the style of the most recent collage and assemblage artists - primarily Jasper Johns and Robert Rauschenberg. The latter became known in Japan primarily through the art critic Yoshiaki Tōno, who published an article about them in the November 1959 issue of Geijutsu shinchō.

The use of the term "Neo-Dada" did not mean that the group claimed any direct link to the original Japanese Dadaists of the 1920s (such as Tomoyoshi Murayama or the group MAVO). The term "Neo-Dada" in this usage was as much a wink to the New York avant-garde as a reference to historical Dadaism. That said, relations between certain members of the Neo-Dada Organizers and their American counterparts could be tense, as exemplified most notably in a confrontation between Ushio Shinohara and Robert Rauschenberg during the performance Twenty Questions to Bob Rauschenberg, which took place at the Sōgetsu Art Center on November 28, 1964.

By adding the English word "organizers" to their name, the group indicated their interest in appropriating (and possibly mocking) the left-wing jargon of the ongoing Anpo protests. The group's Japanese name, written Neo・dada・oruganaizāzu in katakana script with dots in between the words, would normally translate to "Neo-Dada Organizers" in a standard English translation. However, the group's usage of this name was inconsistent, and increasingly came to be abbreviated simply "Neo-Dada" over time. In the announcement for their first exhibition, the group called the exhibition the "Neo-Dadaism Organizer Exhibition" without an "s" at the end, but "Organizers" with an "s" was used in other contexts.

Art historian Reiko Tomii has argued, in a 2005 "Translator's Note," that the group's name should be spelled "Neo Dada" without a hyphen, despite the fact that the term "Neo-Dada" is almost invariably hyphenated in English. However, hyphens do not ordinarily exist in Japanese script, and group members often employed the Japanese interpunct (a centrally-aligned black dot, the closest Japanese equivalent to a hyphen) between the words "Neo" and "Dada," as attested in their flyers, writings, and artworks. In any case, the term "Neo-Dada Organizers" (with hyphen and in the plural), has become a standard term for the group in English language scholarship, as well as in standard art historical reference works.

== Activities ==
The Neo-Dada group members gathered at their leader Masunobu Yoshimura's atelier, called the "White House" (Howaito Hausu), which had been designed by Arata Isozaki and built by Junzō Yoshimura in Shinjuku in 1958. It would serve as their main base of operations until 1962.

At the "White House," they spent day and night discussing, writing leaflets, organizing performances-cum-parties, and working towards the Yomiuri Indépendant Exhibition and other group shows. They arranged a rapid-fire series of exhibitions in 1960, at times accompanied by guerrilla actions on the street.

In 1960, the movement against the renewal of the U.S.-Japan Security Treaty had spread throughout the country and formed the background to the violent political upheaval of the time. In Tokyo, the Diet was surrounded by the crowd of demonstrators, and in the middle of the ranting and tumult, Shūsaku Arakawa threw a brick at the police: legend has it that, as a result, the demonstration turned into a riot. The Neo-Dada Organizers actively took part in the anti-Treaty protests on the streets of Tokyo, but deliberately sought to conflate political revolution with artistic revolution. For example, they paraded through the streets with leaflets, lightbulbs, or other bizarre paraphernalia attached all over their bodies and replaced shouts of "Anpo hantai" ("down with the Security Treaty") with cries of "Anfo hantai" ("down with Art Informel").

In parallel with these activist activities, the group organized three official exhibitions and individual members of the collective participated in the major events of the early 1960s, especially the Yomiuri Indépendant Exhibition cycle (1949-1963) and at the Sogetsu Art Center (1958-1971).

=== Selected events ===
==== First Neo-Dada Exhibition (April 4–9, 1960) ====
The first "official" Neo-Dada Organizers exhibition was held at the Ginza Gallery in Tokyo. The group displayed found objects and garbage while playing jazz tapes and "sexy whispers." Meanwhile, a half-naked man hacked at the "artworks" with an axe. The sounds of objects being destroyed were recorded, and then played loudly out into the street from the gallery's window. Betsujin Ishibashi also performed his work Fifteen Minutes in a Waseda Street in the Morning, reminiscent of American Neo-Dadaist Robert Rauschenberg’s Automobile Tire Print (1951), in which Ishibashi laid a large sheet of paper in the street and let passing automobiles run it over before retrieving the dirtied paper 15 minutes later.

==== Anpo Commemoration Event (June 18, 1960) ====
On June 18, 1960, just three days after student activist Michiko Kanba was killed in a clash with police at the National Diet as part of the ongoing Anpo protests, group members convened at Yoshinobu's "White House" atelier and staged a performance called Anpo Commemoration Event (安保記念エベント) for gathered reporters and television cameras, supposedly to "commemorate" the failure of the protests to stop the passage of the U.S.-Japan Security Treaty. Several group members group stripped naked and danced wildly. Yoshimura appeared with a massive erect penis and testicles made of cloth, paper, and string tied to his loins, white arrows painted on his chest, and a gaping red wound painted on his stomach that looked as if he had just disembowled himself in a seppuku suicide ritual, and Arakawa appeared in a grotesque, monster-like costume and gulped directly from a bottle of strong shōchū while dancing around and making strange noises. The performance concluded with the group gathering around a large plywood panel and taking turns ritualistically destroying it with acid, fire, and a hatchet. Shortly after this somber event concluded, the Security Treaty was automatically passed in the Upper House of the Japanese Diet, in accordance with Japanese law.

==== Second Neo-Dada Exhibition (July 1–10, 1960) ====
The second "official" Neo-Dada Exhibition took place at Yoshimura's atelier in Shinjuku. Group member Tatsumi Yoshino set his aptly-named work Danger alight inside the atelier.

==== Beach Show (July 20, 1960) ====
The Beach Show was performed at Zaimokuza Beach in Kamakura. In a performance filmed by television station TBS, male members carried out sadistic acts against women associated with the group, including Sayako Kishimoto. The event was representative of the male oppression reigning in the group, where women - already in the minority - were subjected to physical abuse and their work was not regarded as equal to that of other male members. These behaviors reflected the idea in vogue at the time in certain artistic circles that the subversion of societal norms required, among other things, the liberalization of violence, particularly sexist violence.

==== Third Neo-Dada Exhibition (September 1–7, 1960) ====
The third and final "official" Neo-Dada Exhibition was put on at the Hibiya Gallery near Hibiya Park. Ushio Shinohara, sporting his trademark mohawk hairstyle, installed a temporary installation in Hibiya Park and then slashed it to ribbons. Masunobu Yoshimura wrapped his naked body with the group's exhibition flyers and Kinpei Masuzawa covered himself in fragile glass lightbulbs before proceeding to stroll through downtown Tokyo.

==== Bizarre Assembly (September 30, 1960) ====
The Bizarre Assembly, an outdoor destructive performance, was held at Yoshimura's "White House" atelier in Shinjuku. Yoshimura, Masuzawa, and Shinohara struck jagged holes into a metal sheet. Shinohara also performed his now-famous “boxing painting,” in which he punched a large piece of paper with boxing gloves that had been dipped in ink.

==== Dinner Commemorating Our Defeat in the War (August 15, 1962) ====
On the 17th anniversary of Japan's surrender in World War II, some members from Neo-Dada reunited along with Group Ongaku and Tatsumi Hijikata to stage a collaborative performance, entitled Dinner Commemorating Our Defeat in the War (敗戦記念晩餐会), in a Tokyo suburb with the help of art critic Yoshida Yoshie. The event consisted of the performers eating a sumptuous dinner eaten before an audience, whose members had unwittingly purchased a 200-yen ticket for the privilege of watching them. The night was subtitled "Art minus Art" (Geijutsu mainasu geijutsu). During the evening, several performances followed one another: Masunobu Yoshimura brushed his teeth for about 30 minutes until his mouth ran with blood, Shō Kazakura stood on a chair and pressed a hot iron to his chest as part of a "ritual to execute the will of the Marquis de Sade," Yasunao Tone and Group Ongaku gave a concert of experimental music, and Tatsumi Hijikata stripped naked and performed Butoh, among others.

== Photo documentation ==
In addition to the above named events and activities, the group also engaged in a number of spontaneous performative acts, including street demonstrations, stage performances, outdoor performances, and social gatherings. These events became the source of media spectacle, and were avidly documented by photographers, including Kenji Ishiguro, Takeo Ishimatsu, Masanori Kobayashi, Shōmei Tōmatsu, William Klein and Jacqueline Paul.

Compared to Kyūshū-ha, which was based in a remote region, Neo-Dada was able to exploit the power of the mass media concentrated in Tokyo. As curator Raiji Kuroda has pointed out, members of Neo-Dada seemed to know the value of getting themselves seen; with the mass audience in mind they performed in front of photographers and television camera crews.

According to art historian Reiko Tomii, these different forms of photographic and videographic captures are typical of the networks of artistic collaborations (intrinsically collaborative practices of the group and then collaboration with photographers), while being essential for the preservation and sharing of these anti-art practices, of which few physical traces remain.

== Dissolution ==
Although the Neo-Dada Organizers never officially disbanded, they did not hold any major public events after the fall of 1960, after which time many of the group's leading members began to pursue their own individual artistic activities. In October 1960, five female dancers from the Nobutoshi Tsuda Dance Studio in Meguro visited the White House, and Yoshimura shocked everyone by suddenly proposing to and marrying one of them. Thereafter, according to Shinohara Ushio, the Neo-Dada Organizers group "was essentially dissolved."

In 1962, Yoshimura sold his White House atelier and decamped to New York City. Shūsaku Arakawa, Tetsumi Kudō, and a bit later Ushio Shinohara, despairing of the reception of their work in their own country, similarly went into exile in New York or Paris.

== Legacy ==
Although short-lived, Neo-Dada's bizarre and spectacular performances received outsized media attention, and proved influential on a number of Japanese artistic collectives active later in the 1960s and associated with the "anti-art" movement, including Zero Jigen, Group Ongaku, and Hi-Red Center.

In retrospect, the Tokyo art world was clearly on the verge of a fundamental shift. One figure from the Neo-Dada circle who chose to remain in Japan was Genpei Akasegawa. He joined forces with Jirо̄ Takamatsu and Natsuyuki Nakanishi to form Hi-Red Center, and together they continued agitating within the Tokyo art scene. Not unlike Neo-Dada, Hi-Red Center had a relatively open approach to membership, with other artists often joining their actions and events.

== Notable members ==
Membership in the group was fluid and hard to pinpoint. However, art historian Raiji Kuroda defines the group's core members as follows: artists listed on two promotional fliers (announcements) made for the first and second group exhibitions, plus those who participated directly in the third exhibition. Tetsumi Kudō and Tomio Miki refused to officially join the group, but almost invariably participated in their events and activities.

=== Neo-Dada Organizers ===
- Masunobu Yoshimura, founder (1932–2011)
- Genpei Akasegawa (1937-2014)
- Shūsaku Arakawa (1936-2010)
- Hiroko Hiraoka
- Betsujin Ishibashi (born 1938)
- Shō Kazakura (1936-2007)
- Sayako Kishimoto (1939-1988)
- Kinpei Masuzawa
- Ueno Kizō
- Ushio Shinohara (born 1932)
- Santarō Tanabe
- Shintarō Tanaka
- Sōroku Toyoshima
- Jun Ueda
- Tatsumi Yoshino

=== Neo-Dada sympathizers (non-members but sometimes participated) ===
- Tatsumi Hijikata (1928-1986)
- Toshi Ichiyanagi (1933-2022)
- Arata Isozaki (born 1931)
- Tetsumi Kudō (1935-1990)
- Tomio Miki (1937-1978)
- Natsuyuki Nakanishi (1935-2016)
- Shūzō Takiguchi (1903-1979)
- Yasunao Tone (born 1935)
