= Aomori Museum of Art =

- 青森県立美術館
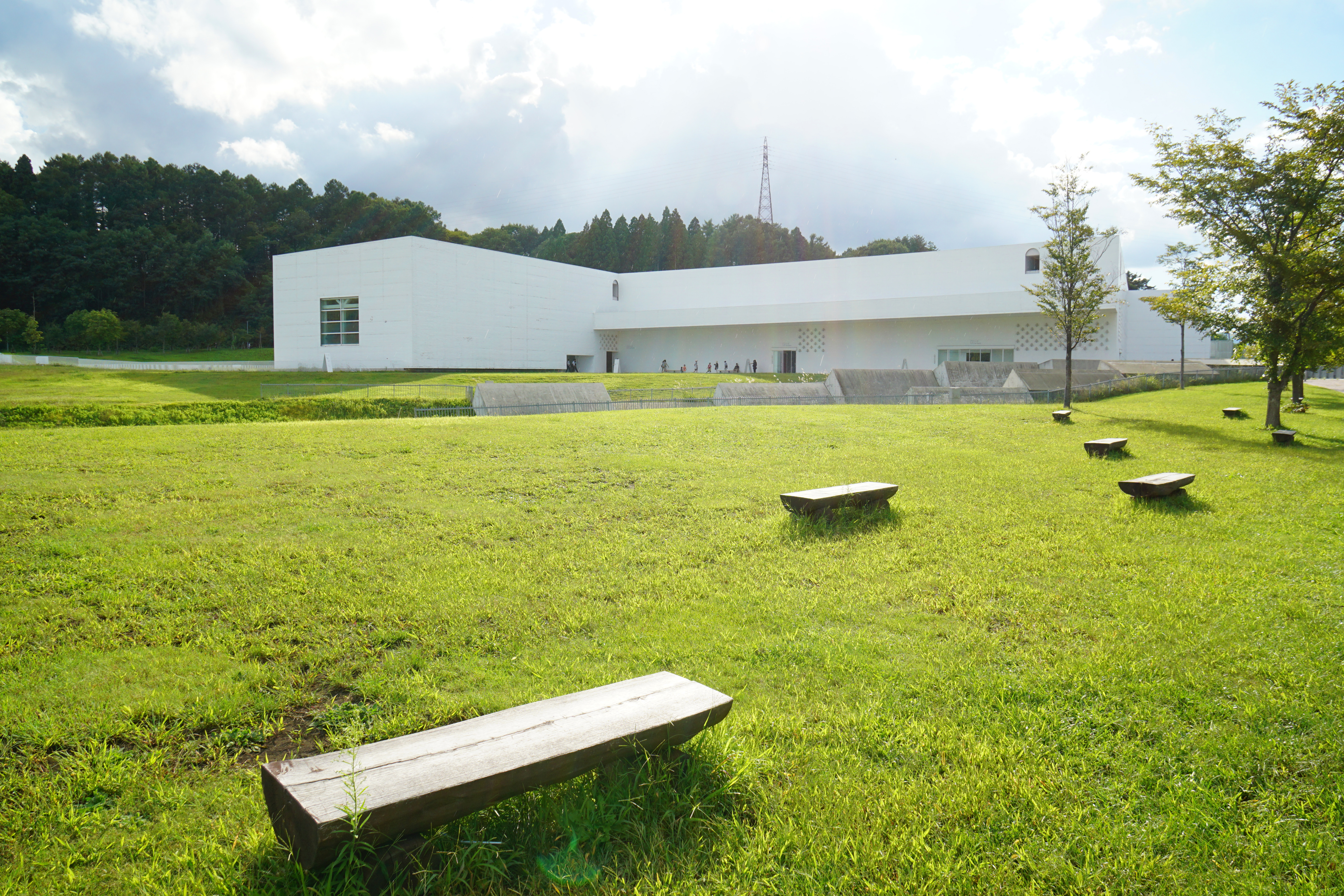
- Location: 185 Chikano, Yasuta, Aomori City, Aomori Prefecture, Japan
- Coordinates: 40.8073°N 140.7009°E
- Type: Art museum
- Owner: Aomori Prefecture
- Website: www.aomori-museum.jp/en/

The Aomori Museum of Art (青森県立美術館, Aomori Kenritsu Bijutsukan) is a museum in Aomori, Japan, opened in July 2006. It is located near Sannai-Maruyama Site, which the museum's design takes inspiration from in its partially-buried structure. The museum houses more than 120 works from drawings to three-dimensional works by Yoshitomo Nara, a young artist from Aomori Prefecture. The museum is also active in having concerts, plays, and workshops. Since opening in 2006, the Aomori Museum of Art with its goal of introducing the arts of Aomori to the world has collected and exhibited works from Aomori native artists such as Shiko Munakata, Shuji Terayama, Yoshitomo Nara, and Tohl Narita. The Aomori Dog by Yoshimoto Nara has become the museum's iconic symbol.

== Collection ==
Artists related to Aomori Prefecture include.

- Shikō Munakata
- Tetsumi Kudo
- Shūji Terayama
- Yoshitomo Nara
