= Cutie and the Boxer =

- Theatrical release poster
- Directed by: Zachary Heinzerling
- Produced by: Zachary Heinzerling; Lydia Dean Pilcher; Patrick Burns; Sierra Pettengill; Executive: Kiki Miyake
- Starring: Noriko Shinohara; Ushio Shinohara
- Cinematography: Zachary Heinzerling
- Edited by: David Teague
- Music by: Yasuaki Shimizu
- Production companies: Cine Mosaic; Ex Lion Tamer; Little Magic Films
- Distributed by: RADiUS-TWC
- Release dates: January 19, 2013 (Sundance); August 16, 2013
- Running time: 82 minutes
- Country: United States
- Languages: English; Japanese
- Box office: $199,100

Cutie and the Boxer is a 2013 American documentary film produced, shot, and directed by Zachary Heinzerling. The film focuses on the chaotic 40-year marriage of two artists, Noriko Shinohara and her husband the boxing painter Ushio, featuring original artwork by the couple. Heinzerling said of the couple: "When I first met [the Shinoharas], I was just struck by the raw spirit and beauty that emanates from their faces, their lifestyle, their art, everything about them has so much purpose and character. Even if you don’t speak Japanese, even if you have no previous knowledge of their artwork or who they are, you’re immediately captivated by their presence. They live in a world that’s kind of a time warp that hearkens back to the ‘70s New York SoHo art scene that is sort of canonized in history, certainly from my point of view."

== Synopsis ==
The film is about the difficult 40-year relationship between Ushio and Noriko Shinohara, a Japanese-born husband and wife who are both artists who live in Brooklyn, New York. Ushio Shinohara is a small player in the contemporary art world, known for painting with a pair of paint-soaked boxing gloves and his oversized motorcycle sculptures made of cardboard.

Their family has struggled financially for many years. Noriko, who is more than 20 years younger than Ushio, set aside her own art career to raise their son Alex and serve as Ushio's unpaid assistant, receptionist and chef. Noriko has also worked on her art, a character she created named Cutie. Cutie's story is told in a comic-book narrative, where she comes to New York and falls for a broke older artist named Bullie. By the end of the movie, Ushio has begun to recognize that he's not the only artist in the family and they hold a joint art opening at a SoHo gallery.

== Reception ==
=== Critical response ===
Cutie and the Boxer has an approval rating of 95% on the review aggregator website Rotten Tomatoes, based on 74 reviews, and an average rating of 7.74/10.The website's critical consensus states, "A beautifully-made documentary that explores the challenges and richness of both marriage and art through the lens of a fascinating and complex couple". It also has a score of 83 out of 100 on Metacritic, based on 25 critics, indicating "universal acclaim".

=== Awards ===
The film and film director have been nominated and won a number of awards, including:

- Won the 2013 Sundance Film Festival "Best Director Award" for Zachary Heinzerling for directing Cutie and the Boxer. The committee cited: "It's rare to see a film so beautifully crafted in all aspects. It captures the complex nature of love and art in a mesmerizing and deeply human way." The film was nominated for Grand Jury Prize for the film during the same festival.
- They also won second place in Audience Awards during the 2013 Tribeca Film Festival.
- It earned Special Mention in Grierson Awards during the 2013 London Film Festival with the citation: "For the original and creative way in which the filmmakers crafted an intimate portrait of a relationship."
- During the 2013 Full Frame Documentary Film Festival, director Zachary Heinzerling won the "Charles E. Guggenheim Emerging Artist Award".
- It was nominated in 2014 for the Academy Award for Best Documentary Feature at the 86th Academy Awards, but lost out to 20 Feet from Stardom.
