= Natsuyuki Nakanishi =

Japanese artist

Natsuyuki Nakanishi (Kanji: 中西夏之, Nakanishi Natsuyuki, b. July 14, 1935, Tokyo, d. October 23, 2016) was a Japanese visual and conceptual artist associated with the 1960s avant-garde art movement in Japan. His artworks ranged from Neo-Dadaist object-based works, happenings and performance art, to abstract painting. Nakanishi co-founded the groundbreaking artistic collective Hi-Red Center along with Jirо̄ Takamatsu and Genpei Akasegawa. Later in his career, Nakanishi would become known for painting practice featuring subdued palettes and idiosyncratic marks. He is also recognized for his pedagogical work, including his involvement with the experimental Bigakko school as well as professorship as Tokyo University of the Arts.

== Early life and career ==
Nakanishi was born in Ōimachi, Shinagawa, Tokyo in 1935. In 1958, he graduated with a bachelor's degree from Tokyo University of the Arts, where he focused on oil painting. Jirō Takamatsu, who would become an important collaborator, was a classmate of Nakanishi’s during this time. While at Tokyo University of the Arts, Nakanishi became interested in art’s ability to engage social issues when he came into contact with the “workers’ culture circle” movement. In 1960, Nakanishi was a frequent participant in the activities of the short-lived but influential "anti-art" collective Neo-Dada Organizers, of which his future Hi-Red Center compatriot Genpei Akasegawa was a member.

Nakanishi began his artistic career as a painter, creating works such as Map of Human (Ningen no Chizu) in 1959 and Rhyme ‘60 in 1960. Both paintings use paint, enamel and sand. The latter of these paintings was part of his “Rhyme” series, all of which employed the similar techniques, materials and imagery and which earned Nakanishi an honorable mention at the Shell Art Exhibition at the Museum of Modern Art Kanazawa in 1959. Both the “Rhyme” series and Map of Human create a sense of topography as well as biomorphic forms on the cellular level. The result is a visual analogy between a macro perspective such as one achieve by a satellite and a micro one such as one achieve by a microscope.

== Yamanote Line Incident ==
On October 18, 1962, Nakanishi, along with future Hi-Red Center collaborator Jirо̄ Takamatsu and other collaborators, carried out an artistic happening they titled the "Yamanote Line Incident" (山手線事件, Yamanote-sen jiken), in which they boarded a Yamanote loop line train heading counter-clockwise on its route, disrupting the normalcy of passenger's commutes with a series of bizarre performative actions.

On the Fluxus-produced map of Hi-Red Center’s activities, compiled and edited with the help of Shigeko Kubota, the Yamanote Line Incident is listed as number three. This is despite the fact that the Yamanote Line Incident is now considered to belong more properly to the pre-history of Hi-Red Center. The work is printed as such:

“18 Oct. Event on Yamate loop line street car.

1. A continuous black string with various everyday objects attached to it at intervals was laid out on street from moving street car along its circular route.
2. Compact objects were hung from hand straps inside street car and observed by performers at close range with battery lights.
3. Faces of performers were painted white.
4. Performers read newspapers with holes burned in them.”

The second of these listed components refers to Nakanishi’s “Compact Object” (Konpakuto obuje) works. These objects are ostrich egg shaped resin sculptures, filled with a jumble of various items of everyday use. The Compact Object held in the collection of the Museum of Modern Art has listed as its materials, “Bones, watch and clock parts, bead necklace, hair, eggshell, lens, and other manufactured objects embedded in polyester.” As photo documentation from the Yamanote Line Incident reveal, a Compact Object was fastened by a chain to train’s a hanging passenger handle. Another photograph shows Nakanishi squatting on a train platform in white face paint, hunched over a Compact Object which he is licking as pedestrians watch in confusion. The event was featured in the magazine Keishō, then under the editorship of Yoshihiko Imaizumi. According to Genpei Akasegawa, Nakanishi and Takamatsu’s use of the Yamanote Line “as a site for their event was to destroy the hierarchical status of art by bringing it into the ‘space of daily activities.’” Nakanishi’s Compact Objects were also displayed in “Room as Alibi”, a group exhibition organized by Yūsuke Nakahara at Naiqua Gallery in Tokyo.

== Hi-Red Center ==
See Hi-Red Center for more information.

Also featured in “Room as Alibi” were Jirо̄ Takamatsu and Akasegawa Genpei with whom Nakanishi would form Hi-Red Center with in 1963. The group's name was formed from the first kanji characters of the three artists' surnames: "high" (the "Taka" in Takamatsu), "red" (the "Aka" in Akasegawa), and "center" (the "Naka" in Nakanishi).

A notable example of Nakanishi’s work at this time is Nakanishi’s artwork/happening Clothespins Assert Churning Action (Sentaku basami wa kakuhan kodo o shucho suru), in which he attached hundreds of metal clothespins to a variety of household and other objects as well as his own body, and invited exhibition goers to attach additional clothespins themselves. As a part of this work, Nakanishi walked around in public with his entire head covered in hundreds of clothespins. The performance was accompanied with a series of paintings, also littered with clothespins attached to their surface. Some paintings also included holes burned through their surface, reminiscent of the burned holes in the newspapers performatively read as part of the Yamanote Line Incident. The work was a part of the fifteenth Yomiuri Indépendant Exhibition, taking place at the Tokyo Metropolitan Art Museum from March 2 to 15, 1963. This was the only year that Nakanishi participated in the Yomiuri Indépendant exhibition. Clothespins Assert Churning Action was also exhibited on May 28 of that year as part of Hi-Red Center’s “Sixth Mixer Plan” event. As Nam June Paik recounts, “It was a hideous picture that induced the viewer’s empathy, knowing how painful it would be to be bitten by the springs of numerous laundry clips.” Akasegawa reflected on the piece with the question, “In the knowledge that this was not paint but simple, everyday objects, had we not discovered the minimum separation between painting and real life?” Another photo from the “Sixth Mixer Plan” iteration of the work shows Nakanishi, adorned with clothespins, holding what is presumably one of his Rhyme ‘63 objects encased in tinfoil and clothespins. These egg shaped objects are roughly the same shape and size of his compact objects but are made of lacquer and enamel on plaster and are covered with the painted motif from his “Rhyme” paintings.

Other activities listed on the Fluxus edition that explicitly mention Nakanishi are number two occurring September 15th,1962, “Opening day of Jiritu-Gattuko. Nakanishi gave lecture on art illustrating it on stage with pipe smoke,” number six, “1 Mar. 1963 Yomiuri andi-pandan show at Ueno museum” where “10,000 clothespins made by Nakanisi [sic] were attached to museum visitors,” and number eleven, an NHK television show on November 3rd, 1963 which included a “Foaming fountain by Nakanishi.”

From January 30 to February 15, 1964, Nakanishi was featured in the exhibition “Young Seven” curated by Yoshiaki Tōno at Minami Gallery, Tokyo. Tōno used the occasion of the exhibition to further his idea of Anti-Art, which he felt arose from “an ‘everyday’ that is cut off from war memory, one that feels like an unabashedly boring, never-ending Sunday.” Tōno describes Nakanishi’s works from the exhibition as “sickly casts… painted with the bloody splash of the everyday.” Elsewhere, also in 1964, Atsushi Miyakawa referred to Nakanishi’s work in the “Young Seven” exhibition as a “furious ambivalence toward identity and metamorphosis.”

== Collaboration with Hijikata Tatsumi ==
Nakanishi was also a close collaborator with Tatsumi Hijikata, creator of Ankoku Butō ("Dance of utter darkness"), more commonly known simply as Butoh in English. The partnership began during Genpei Akasegawa's Model 1,000-Yen Note-Incident when Hijikata approached Nakanishi to make theatrical props and related art for his choreography. This included Nakanishi’s work on Hijikata Tatsumi to Nihonjin: Nikutai no hanran (Hijikata Tatsumi and the Japanese: Revolt of the Flesh), 1968, where Nakanishi crafted copper plates that were hung above the stage. In his “A Tectonic Shift in Art: From the Expo to the Hippie Movement,” Yasunao Tone describes another Butoh performance with “an assemblage of people wearing Nakanishi’s white shirts and white pants.” Influenced by Hijikata and Butoh, Nakanishi strove to make paintings between the corporeal and the painterly. This underscores the significance of the body in relation to the phenomenological interrogations Nakanishi’s conducted through his artistic practice. As art historian Michio Hayashi has observed of the connected but different approaches by the two artists, “In contrast to Hijikata, who eagerly incorporated the effects of the gravitational pull on his body as an important element of his choreography, and, moreover, positively acknowledged the physical ground under his feet as their unquestionable support, Nakanishi expressed his suspicion about such phenomenological optimism.”

== Return to painting ==
After Nakanishi’s radical questioning of art’s conventions through his proximity to the Neo-Dada Organizers and his work with Hi-Red Center, he notably returned to painting with sustained and intensive engagement with the medium. Contemporaneous with his collaborative efforts with Hijikata was Nakanishi’s “Hopscotch at the Summit” works, a series of ten paintings that he worked on through from 1965 to 1971. These semi-abstract works seem to radiate out from a single point, employing almost psychedelic motifs suggesting flower or animal imagery.

Beginning in the latter half of the 1960s, Nakanishi began focusing on painting large-scale abstract paintings using subdued colors such as gray, white, purple, and yellow-green, which he continued to produce for the rest of his career. Nakanishi’s conception of painting from this point, however, would become more expansive than his early practice, incorporating elements of performance, sculpture and installation.

According to Hayashi, Nakanishi’s later career paintings are marked by “the problem of restoring the vertical orientation of painting after the loss of its taken-for-granted traditional posture and the exposure of its irreducible materiality.” As Reiko Tomii notes, Nakanishi has also described this as the “frontality” of painting, with his first use of the word on record in 1981. This awareness of space in one’s relation to the painting can also be observed in his use of elongated paintbrushes that forced him to paint from an unusual distance. Thus, after the dismantling of painterly conventions during the sixties, Nakanishi turned to painting as a way to inquire into the relation between perception and metaphysics. In this regard, Nakanishi differentiated himself from “continental or constructivist art” which he felt demonstrated a “blind faith in earth, or ground.” His search for another means of orientation often relies on water, shown in his various “rituals” such as placing a glass of water near a canvas in progress, trying to cut a perfect circle from a sheet of paper while abroad a boat floating on a pond, and going to Cape Inubō to observe the Pacific Ocean as a panoramic horizon. A paradox contained in the latter of these rituals, the simultaneously curvature and flatness of the horizon, gives some insight into the basis of Nakanishi’s painting practice. “[T]he painter’s attempt to establish the verticals plane of painting has to become, simultaneously, that of reestablishing the whole phenomenal environment of which his own body, or potential bodies, constitutes a part,” Hayashi writes. The relativity of curvature and flatness is further explored in his Arc paintings, the first of which was made in 1978. In these works, Nakanishi attached a bamboo arc at the point of its apex to the surface of the canvas by which “the verticality of the surface becomes something to be ‘re-presented’ through its differential relation to the real the arc.”

Inextricable from this interrogation of space was, for Nakanishi, also the interrogation of time. This too was probed through an expansive approach to painting, most notably through installation strategies by which the paintings comprised a field that the viewer became immersed in. Such a strategy was first tried at his 1997 exhibition at the Museum of Contemporary Art Tokyo, and developed upon at the Aichi Prefectural Museum of Art Nagoya in 2002 and the Kawamura Memorial DIC Museum of Art, Sakura in 2012. At the Kawamura Memorial DIC Museum of Art, Nakanishi installed the canvases so that they precariously stood vertically on easels. These painting-adorned easels were then arranged in an overlapping manner, creating a sense of perceptual depth and immersion by the aggregated picture planes. The effect is to situate the aesthetic experience within a specific spatial and temporal point that dissolves into the unstructured “current” of experience. In his essay, On the Bridge, Nakanishi writes:

“The painter ceases to walk along the river and becomes a person on a bridge. Not to cross the bridge, but to see the river’s frontal view. He has switched viewpoints from the horizontal flow, the linear flow of time, to face the current of time, a vertical temporality, time itself, that surges from the frontal view of the river.”

His experiments in painting were reflected upon in an anthology published in 1989 titled Daikakko (Large Parentheses—Apparatus, to stand forever to gaze gently).

== Career as educator ==
Nakanishi was one of the founders of the experimental and radical art education program Bigakko, whose founding was prompted by the decline of the leftist movements in Japan at the end of the 1960s. The first programs at the school were Hiroshi Nakamura’s painting atelier and Nakanishi’s drawing atelier in February 1969, each composed of fifteen students. One exercise Nakanishi taught was a rotating portraits project where five groups of three students would draw each other’s portrait as well as their own. Each class also included a performative exercise such as the use of transparent globes to gain understanding of space through the modification of perceptual experience. Another perceptual modification tool used to aid drawing in an exercise was a mirror with a triangle cut out, creating two interacting perspectives to be transcribed to the picture plane of the drawing. In yet another exercise, the students were divided into pairs after which they faced each other and simultaneously places their index finger in the others’ mouth. They were then asked to make a drawing of the feeling. In a similar exercise, the students were asked to eat something and then drink milk as a way to determine where the face ended and the throat began. Such unorthodox teaching methods would continue in Nakanishi’s practice as an educator, such as the exercise of holding a small steel ball in the palm of one’s hand and focusing one’s attention on it while walking about.

According to Nakanishi, the Bigakko’s purpose was not just to provide a radically new form of art education, it was also a structure that could support artists who were not supported by an existing art market. In April 1970 the workshop was introduced with a rotating faculty of Nakanishi, Nakamura, Genpei Akasegawa, Yutaka Matsuzawa, and Mokuma Kikuhata. In April 1996 he became a professor in the Department of Painting at the Tokyo University of the Arts. In 2003 he retired from Tokyo University of the Arts and in 2004 he became a professor at Kurashiki University of Science and Technology where he remained until 2007. He was Professor Emeritus as Tokyo University of the Arts.

== International recognition ==
In recent years, Nakanishi's works have been featured in several exhibitions in several museums worldwide, including The Museum of Modern Art, New York, Museum of Contemporary Art Tokyo, and Seibu Museum. Nakanishi’s performance Clothespins Assert Churning Action, performed on the occasion of Hi-Red Center’s Sixth Mixer Plan event, provides the cover image of MoMA’s “Tokyo: 1955-1970: A New Avant-Garde” catalog. His 1960 work Rhyme-S is held in the collection of the Hirshhorn Museum in Washington, D.C.
