= Neo-Dada =

Art movement from the late 1950s with similarities to the original Dada movement

Neo-Dada was an art movement with audio, visual and literary manifestations that had similarities in method or intent with earlier Dada artwork. It sought to close the gap between art and daily life, and was a combination of playfulness, iconoclasm, and appropriation. In the United States the term was popularized by Barbara Rose in the 1960s and refers primarily, although not exclusively, to work created in that and the preceding decade. There was also an international dimension to the movement, particularly in Japan and in Europe, serving as the foundation of Fluxus, Pop Art and Nouveau réalisme.

Neo-Dada has been exemplified by its use of modern materials, popular imagery, and absurdist contrast. It was a reaction to the personal emotionalism of Abstract Expressionism and, taking a lead from the practice of Marcel Duchamp and Kurt Schwitters, denied traditional concepts of aesthetics.

== Trends ==
Interest in Dada followed in the wake of documentary publications, such as Robert Motherwell's The Dada Painters and Poets (1951) and German language publications from 1957 and later, to which some former Dadaists contributed. However, several of the original Dadaists denounced the label Neo-Dada, especially in its U.S. manifestations, on the grounds that the work was derivative rather than making fresh discoveries; that aesthetic pleasure was found in what were originally protests against bourgeois aesthetic concepts; and because it pandered to commercialism.

Many of the artists who identified with the trend subsequently moved on to other specialities or identified with different art movements and in many cases only certain aspects of their early work can be identified with it. For example, Piero Manzoni's Consacrazione dell'arte dell'uovo sodo (Artistic consecration of the hard-boiled egg, 1959), which he signed with an imprint of his thumb, or his cans of shit (1961) whose price was pegged to the value of their weight in gold, satirizing the concept of the artist's personal creation and art as commodity.

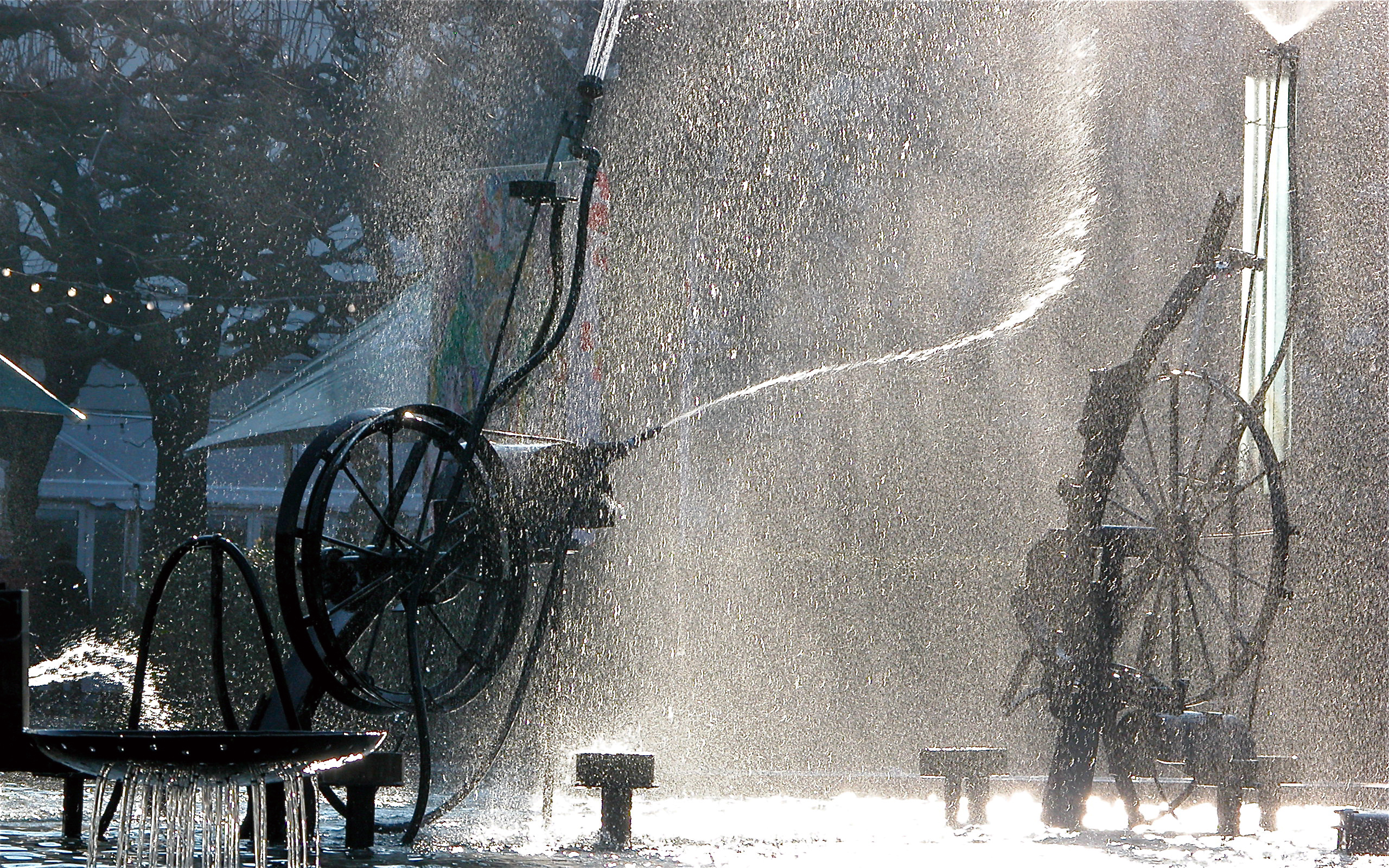
A Jean Tingueley fountain in Basel

An allied approach is found in the creation of collage and assemblage, as in the junk sculptures of the American Richard Stankiewicz, whose works created from scrap have been compared with Schwitters' practice. These objects are "so treated that they become less discarded than found, objets trouvés." Jean Tinguely's fantastic machines, notoriously the self-destructing Homage to New York (1960), were another approach to the subversion of the mechanical.

Although such techniques as collage and assemblage may have served as inspiration, different terms were found for the objects produced, both in the U.S. and in Europe. Robert Rauschenberg labeled as "combines" such works as "Bed" (1955), which consisted of a framed quilt and pillow covered in paint and mounted on the wall. Arman labeled as "accumulations" his collections of dice and bottle tops, and as "poubelles" the contents of trash-bins encased in plastic. Daniel Spoerri created "snare pictures" (tableaux piège), of which the earliest was "Kichka's Breakfast" (1960), and in which the remains of a meal were glued to the cloth and mounted on the table-top affixed to the wall.

== Poems ==
In the Netherlands the poets associated with the 'magazine for texts', Barbarber (1958–71), particularly J. Bernlef and K. Schippers, extended the concept of the readymade into poetry, discovering poetic suggestiveness in such everyday items as a newspaper advert about a lost tortoise and a typewriter test sheet. Another group of Dutch poets infiltrated the Belgian experimentalist magazine Gard Sivik and began to fill it with seemingly inconsequential fragments of conversation and demonstrations of verbal procedures. The writers included C.B. Vaandrager, Hans Verhagen and the artist Armando. On this approach the critic Hugo Brems has commented that "the poet's role in this kind of poetry was not to discourse on reality, but to highlight particular fragments of it which are normally perceived as non-poetic. These poets were not creators of art, but discoverers."

The impersonality that such artists aspired to was best expressed by Jan Schoonhoven (1914–94), the theorist of the Dutch Nul group of artists, to which Armando also belonged: "Zero is first and foremost a new conception of reality, in which the individual role of the artist is kept to a minimum. The Zero artist merely selects, isolates parts of reality (materials as well as ideas stemming from reality) and exhibits them in the most neutral way. The avoidance of personal feelings is essential to Zero." This in turn links it with some aspects of Pop Art and Nouveau Réaliste practice and underlines the rejection of Expressionism.

The beginnings of Concrete Poetry and text montage in the Wiener Gruppe have also been referred back to the example of Raoul Hausmann's letter poems. Such techniques may also owe something to H.N. Werkman's typographical experiments in the Netherlands which had first been put on display in the Stedelijk Museum in 1945.

== Artists linked with the term ==
- Genpei Akasegawa
- Arman
- Joseph Beuys
- Jaap Blonk
- Lee Bontecou
- George Brecht
- John Cage
- César
- John Chamberlain
- Christo
- Merce Cunningham
- Jim Dine
- Jacques Halbert
- Dick Higgins
- Kommissar Hjuler
- Jasper Johns
- Allan Kaprow
- Yves Klein
- Alison Knowles
- George Maciunas
- Piero Manzoni
- Claes Oldenburg
- Yoko Ono
- Neo-Dada Organizers
- Robin Page
- Nam June Paik
- Robert Rauschenberg
- Niki de Saint Phalle
- Ushio Shinohara
- Daniel Spoerri
- Richard Stankiewicz
- Jean Tinguely
- Jacques Villeglé
- Wolf Vostell
- Masunobu Yoshimura

== See also ==
- Anti-art

== Bibliography ==
- Dorothée Brill, Shock and the Senseless in Dada and Fluxus, Dartmouth College 2010
- Catherine Craft, An Audience of Artists: Dada, Neo-Dada, and the Emergence of Abstract Expressionism, University of Chicago 2012
- Susan Hapgood, Neo-Dada: Redefining Art, 1958–62, Universe Books and American Federation of Arts (1994)
- David Hopkins, Neo-avant garde, Amsterdam, New York 2006
- Cecilia Novero, Antidiets of the Avant-Garde: From Futurist Cooking to Eat Art, University of Minnesota 2010
- Owen Smith, Fluxus: The History of an Attitude, San Diego State University 1998
