= Dorothée Selz =

- Born: 1946 (age 79–80); Paris
- Known for: Sculpture

Dorothée Selz (born 1946) is a French sculptor born in Paris. She creates ephemeral, edible sculptures.

== Biography ==
Dorothée Selz was born in Paris in 1946. She sculpts ephemeral, edible sculptures and is recognized as a pioneer of eat art.

In 1972 Selz created "Trans Europe Express", a multicolored landscape featuring a miniature train circuit. The work was acquired by the Centre national des arts plastiques (CNAP) in 1973. Most of the decoration consists of royal icing, applied with a piping bag and fluted tip.

In 1973 Selz produced the series Mimétisme relatif.

In 1978 she presented an exhibition entitled "Sucre d'art".

Her work is featured in an exhibition at Loeve and Co gallery in 2019.

Selz presents her work at various exhibitions in France and around the world.
