= Masunobu Yoshimura =

Japanese visual and conceptual artist

- 吉村 益信
- Born: May 22, 1932; Ōita city, Ōita prefecture, Empire of Japan
- Died: March 15, 2011 (aged 78); Hadano, Kanagawa, Japan
- Education: Musashino Art University
- Occupation: Artist
- Years active: 1951-2011
- Movement: Neo-Dada

Masunobu Yoshimura (吉村 益信, Yoshimura Masunobu; May 22, 1932–March 15, 2011), was a Japanese visual and conceptual artist associated with the Neo-Dada movement. In 1960, he was the founder and leader of the short-lived but influential artistic collective Neo-Dada Organizers, which had as members several young artists who would later become well-known, including Genpei Akasegawa, Shūsaku Arakawa, and Ushio Shinohara. His "White House" atelier in Shinjuku, Tokyo served as the center of the group's activities.

== Early life and education ==
Masunobu Yoshimura was born on May 22, 1932, in Ōita on the southern island of Kyushu, the 9th son of his parents, who ran a pharmacy. While still in high school, he became active in a local art circle, the "New Century Group" (Shin Seiki Gun), which was centered around the local Ōita art supplies store Kimuraya. Other members of this circle from the same area that Yoshimura met at this time included future Neo-Dada collaborators Genpei Akasegawa, Shō Kazakura, and Arata Isozaki.

In 1951, Yoshimura failed the entrance examination to enter the Tokyo University of the Arts and instead enrolled in Musashino Art University in Tokyo, graduating with a specialization in oil painting in 1955. In 1952 while he was still a college student, Yoshimura began earning money by giving painting lessons to children, which he continued doing until 1960. In 1955, Yoshimura began exhibiting artworks at the raucous and non-ideological Yomiuri Indépendant Exhibition. Sponsored by the Yomiuri Shimbun newspaper, this freewheeling exhibition was unjuried and open to anyone, and thus became a site of artistic experimentation that paved the way for new forms of "anti-art," "non-art," and "junk art."

In 1957, Yoshimura used his inheritance from his father to purchase a small piece of land in the Shinjuku neighborhood of Tokyo. He commissioned his friend, the architect Arata Isozaki, to design a combination art studio and residence there. Construction was overseen by Junzō Yoshimura in 1958. The resulting atelier was nicknamed the "White House" (Howaito Hausu), because of the white mortar used in its construction. Yoshimura began inviting his old artist friends from Ōita, as well as other younger artists he had met at the Yomiuri Indépendant, to hang out at his atelier, which would become the center of activities for the art collective Neo-Dada Organizers in 1960.

In both 1959 and 1960, Yoshimura's artworks were awarded third prize in the annual Shell Art Awards Exhibition in Tokyo.

== Neo-Dada Organizers ==
In early 1960, Yoshimura and several other young artists, including Genpei Akasegawa, Shūsaku Arakawa, Shō Kazakura, and Ushio Shinohara, established the art collective "Neo-Dada Organizers" with Yoshimura as their leader, and engaged in a variety of what Akasegawa later called "creative destructive" activities, based out of Yoshimura's White House atelier in Shinjuku.

The term "Neo-Dada" was borrowed from a term used in western art criticism to describe recent works by American artists such as Jasper Johns and Robert Rauschenberg. By adding the English word "organizers" to their name, the group indicated their interest in appropriating (and possibly mocking) the left-wing jargon of the ongoing Anpo protests against the U.S.-Japan Security Treaty.

Pioneers of so-called "anti-art," the Neo-Dada Organizers engaged in all manner of visual and performance artworks, but specialized in producing disturbing, impulsive spectacles, often involving physical destruction of objects, that the art critic Ichirō Hariu deemed "savagely meaningless." The group held three official exhibitions in 1960, as well as a number of bizarre "actions," "events," and "happenings" in which they sought to mock, deconstruct, and in many cases, physically destroy conventional forms of art. Examples included filling galleries with piles of garbage, smashing furniture to the beat of jazz music, and prancing the streets of Tokyo in various states of dress and undress. Using the human body as their medium of art, their violent performances reflected both their dissatisfaction with the restrictive environment of the Japanese art world at the time, as well as contemporary social developments, and the massive 1960 Anpo protests that were rocking Japan at that time.

According to the group's official "manifesto," as read out to gathered journalists at the groups "Anpo Commemoration Event" in Jun 1960:

No matter how much we fantasize about procreation in the year 1960, a single atomic explosion will casually solve everything for us, so Picasso’s fighting bulls no longer move us any more than the spray of blood from a run-over stray cat. As we enter the blood-soaked ring in this 20.6th century—a century which has trampled on sincere works of art—the only way to avoid being butchered is to become butchers ourselves.

The Neo-Dada Organizers were extremely media savvy, and excelled in the art of getting attention from the mass media. Group members, and Yoshimura in particular, were interviewed by curious reporters and journalists on an almost daily basis in the spring and summer of 1960, even when they were not engaging in an event or exhibition.

Although the Neo-Dada Organizers never officially disbanded, they did not hold any major public events after the fall of 1960, after which time many of the group's leading members began to pursue their own individual artistic activities. In October 1960, five female dancers from the Nobutoshi Tsuda Dance Studio in Meguro visited the White House, and Yoshimura shocked everyone by suddenly proposing to and marrying one of them, Midori Ishizaki (the younger sister of art critic Koichirō Ishizaki). Thereafter, according to Shinohara Ushio, the Neo-Dada Organizers group "was essentially dissolved."

Although short-lived, Neo-Dada's bizarre and spectacular performances received outsized media attention, and proved influential on a number of Japanese artistic collectives active later in the 1960s and associated with the "anti-art" movement, including Zero Jigen, Group Ongaku, and Hi-Red Center.

== New York ==
In 1962, Yoshimura sold his White House atelier and decamped to New York City. While in New York, Yoshimura produced a series of objects made of plaster, which he exhibited at a variety of venues, including the Gordon Gallery group exhibitions in 1962 and 1963, the Castellane Gallery group exhibitions in 1964 and 1965, the Chrysler Museum's "New Eye" Exhibition in 1965, and the New York Museum of Modern Art's traveling exhibition "The New Japanese Painting and Sculpture." He also exhibited surrealist-style objects "Moondials" and "Coins" at the "Exhibition of Japanese Artists Overseas" held at the National Museum of Modern Art in Tokyo 1965.

In 1966, Yoshimura held a solo exhibition at Castellane Gallery called "HOW TO FLY," at which he pioneered light art by exhibiting works constructed out of illuminated light bulbs.

Yoshimura hoped to stay in New York, where his career was going extremely well and he was garnering increased international attention, but in 1966 he was forced to return to Japan when he proved unable to renew his visa.

== Later life and career ==
After returning to Japan in 1966, Yoshimura began creating light art using neon tubes. In 1967, he exhibited neon works in an acrylic case at the solo exhibition "Transparents Ceremony" held at the Tokyo Gallery, and also exhibited similar works entitled "32 Neon clouds in Perspective" at the 9th Japan International Art Exhibition that same year. In 1968, he exhibited a work "Anti-Matter Light on Mobius" at the 8th Contemporary Japanese Art Exhibition. This work, in which light runs around a ring-shaped metal band, won the exhibition's Excellence Prize. In 1969, he exhibited his work "200W," made with sand and light bulbs, at the 9th Contemporary Japanese Art Exhibition.

In 1970, Yoshimura was heavily involved in designing large-scale artworks for display at a number of facilities in Expo '70 in Osaka. In 1971 Yoshimura exhibited his work "Pig=Pig Rib" using stuffed pigs at the 10th Contemporary Japanese Art Exhibition. In 1972 he held a solo exhibition at the Sato Gallery, the "Blind Men and An Elephant Exhibition," in which he displayed a life-sized replica of elephant sliced into slices.

From 1975 to 1979, Yoshimura served as secretary general of the newly formed Artists Union, working to promote the independence and welfare of artists in Japan, but in 1979 the organization collapsed and was dissolved. Mentally and emotionally exhausted, Yoshimura withdrew to the mountains near Hadano, Kanagawa, where he set up a small atelier far from the center of Japan's art scene in Tokyo. There, he passed the remainder of his years in relative obscurity.

Yoshimura died of multiple organ failure on March 15, 2011. He was 78 years old.

== Collections ==
Many of Yoshimura's artworks are held in the Ōita City Art Museum and the Ōita Prefectural Art Museum. "Moondials" and "Coins" are held at the National Museum of Modern Art, Tokyo. Some of the artworks Yoshimura produced while living in New York are held by MoMA.

== Awards ==
- 1959 – Third Prize, Shell Art Awards
- 1960 – Third Prize, Shell Art Awards
- 1968 – Excellence Prize, 8th Contemporary Japanese Art Exhibition
