= Zachary Heinzerling =

American film director

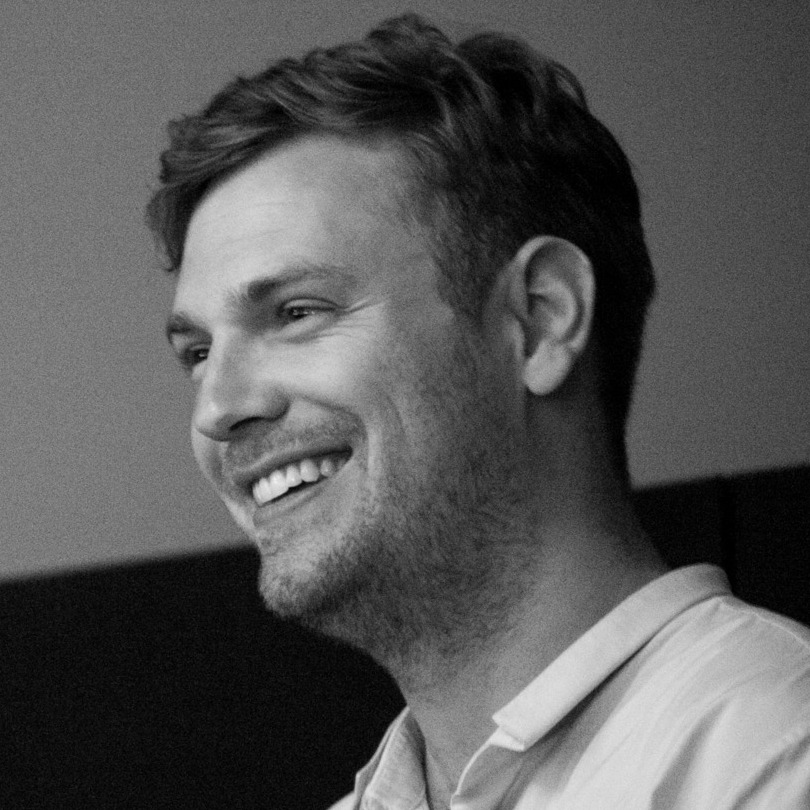
- Heinzerling in 2014
- Born: Zachary Heinzerling; Houston, Texas, U.S.
- Occupation: Director

Zachary 'Zach' Heinzerling is an American film director. He is best known for writing and directing the 2013 documentary film Cutie and the Boxer for which he won 'Best Director' at the 2013 Sundance Film Festival. The film was also nominated at the 2014 Oscars for Best Documentary Film.

== Early life ==
Heinzerling grew up in Houston, Texas. His parents were teachers at the Chinquapin Preparatory School and also served as its head administrators.

== Career ==
He began his career at HBO, where he worked as a Producer and Cinematographer on various shows, including the Emmy Award-winning series 24/7.

Heinzerling's critically acclaimed debut feature, Cutie and the Boxer, premiered at the 2013 Sundance Film Festival where it won the 'Best Director' award. The film featured on many Top 10 film lists of 2013, including that of Joe Morgenstern of the Wall Street Journal and A.O. Scott from The New York Times. The film went on to receive a field leading three 2014 Cinema Eye Honors, for Outstanding Debut Feature, Outstanding Original Score, and Outstanding Visual Effects. Heinzerling was awarded the Charles Guggenheim Emerging Artist award at the 2013 Full Frame Film Festival and was the recipient of the 2013 International Documentary Association's Emerging Documentary Filmmaker Award. Cutie and the Boxer went on to b|e nominated for the 2014 Directors Guild of America Award for Outstanding Directorial Achievement in a Documentary, and the Academy Award for Best Documentary Feature.

Heinzerling directed a five-part web series with Beyoncé Knowles-Carter entitled Self-Titled to coincide with her 2013 album Beyoncé. In 2019, he directed an episode of Dirty Money for Netflix.

Heinzerling directed the critically acclaimed 6-part series McCartney 3,2,1 starring Sir Paul McCartney and Rick Rubin which premiered on Hulu in 2021.

In 2023, Heinzerling's directed the documentary series, Stolen Youth: Inside the Cult at Sarah Lawrence, about the victims of cult leader Larry Ray.

== Filmography ==
Film

Year	Title	Director	Writer	Producer	Cinematographer	Notes
2013	Cutie and the Boxer	Yes	Yes	Yes	Yes	
2015	Hugh the Hunter	Yes	Yes	No	No	Short film

Series

- Self Titled
- McCartney 3,2,1
- Stolen Youth: Inside the Cult at Sarah Lawrence

One-off episodes

- Dirty Money - "The Man at the Top" (2020)
- Black Gold (2022)
