= Genpei Akasegawa =

Japanese artist

- 赤瀬川 原平
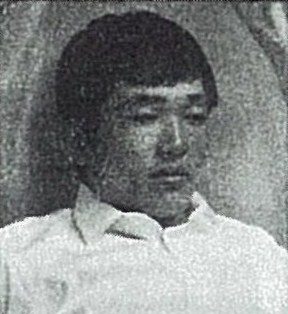
- Akasegawa in 1961
- Born: Katsuhiko Akasegawa; March 27, 1937; Yokohama, Kanagawa, Japan
- Died: October 26, 2014 (aged 77); Tokyo, Japan
- Other name: Katsuhiko Otsuji
- Occupations: Conceptual artist, photographer, essayist, short story writer
- Known for: Hi-Red Center Neo-Dada Organizers Hyperart Thomasson

Katsuhiko Akasegawa (赤瀬川 克彦, Akasegawa Katsuhiko; March 27, 1937 – October 26, 2014), known by his pseudonym Genpei Akasegawa (赤瀬川 原平, Akasegawa Genpei), was a Japanese artist and writer. In literary works, he also went by Katsuhiko Otsuji (尾辻 克彦, Otsuji Katsuhiko). A member of the influential artist groups Neo-Dada Organizers and Hi-Red Center, Akasegawa went on to maintain a multi-disciplinary practice throughout his career as an individual artist. He is also known for having coined the term and concept of Hyperart Thomasson and for having founded the Rojō Kansatsu Gakkai (路上観察学会; lit. 'Street Observation Society').

Akasegawa has had retrospective exhibitions at the Hiroshima City Museum of Contemporary Art, Chiba City Museum, and Oita City Museum. His work is in the permanent collection at Museum of Modern Art in New York. Artist Nam June Paik has described Akasegawa as "one of those unexportable geniuses of Japan".

== Biography ==
=== Early life ===
Akasegawa was born in 1937, in Yokohama, and moved to Ashiya, Ōita and Nagoya during his childhood because of his father's job. The artist Shūsaku Arakawa was a high school classmate in Nagoya. In the 1950s Akasegawa moved to Tokyo where he attended Musashino Art University in 1955 to study oil painting.

In 1956 and 1957, Akasegawa submitted artworks to the Nihon Indépendant exhibition. Being poor at the time, he “could not shut [his] eyes to the poverty around [him] and engage in the pursuit of pure artistic ideals.” Akasegawa also reported his frustration with the socialist realism aesthetic that predominated at the Nihon Indépendant during these years, wanting something which “linked real life and painting as closely as possible.”

=== Neo-Dada Organizers ===
In the late 1950s, Akasegawa began submitting works to the more freewheeling and less ideological Yomiuri Indépendant Exhibition. He has recalled that toward the end of the 1950s a competition emerged among artists showing at the Yomiuri Indépendant to see whose painting could extend furthest from its surface. This, he claimed, freed him from conventional ways of approaching art-making, and may be connected to the development his art underwent in 1960. This year proved a turning point for the artist as it gave rise to both the massive Anpo protests and the founding of the Neo-Dada Organizers. The group was founded officially by Masunobu Yoshimura in April 1960 with their group show at Ginza Gallery in Tokyo. The members included, along with Akasegawa, artists acquainted through the Yomiuri Indépendant such as Ushio Shinohara, Shō Kazakura, Kinpei Masuzawa, and Shūsaku Arakawa. Other artist frequently involved though not officially a part of the group included Tetsumi Kudō, Tomio Miki, and Natsuyuki Nakanishi, with whom Akasegawa would later go on to form Hi-Red Center.

The Neo-Dada Organizers group engaged in a series of bizarre "events" and "happenings" that blended visual and performance art, which the art critic Yoshiaki Tōno labeled “Anti-Art” (Han-geijutsu) and Ichirō Hariu, another critic, deemed “savagely meaningless.” As art historian Reiko Tomii has concisely put it, “the goal of Anti-Art was to question and dismantle Art (geijutsu) as a cultural and metaphysical construct of modern times.” The activities of the Neo-Dada Organizers can be said to conform with what Akasegawa has since termed “creative destruction” in which systematic iconoclasm toward conventions and rules were meant to open possibilities for new forms of art. Such include Anpo Commemoration Event (Anpo ki’nen ebento) which they staged on June 18, 1960, just three days after the death of Michiko Kanba at the storming of the National Diet Building during an Anpo protest. In this group performance, which included prosthetic male genitalia, a fake wound reminiscent of seppuku rituals, and other disturbing imagery, Akasegawa appeared in a head-wrap and a “grotesque, monster-like costume and took massive gulps directly from a bottle of strong shōchū alcohol while dancing around bizarrely and making awful noises.” Anpo Commemoration Event demonstrated the overlapping concerns of the Anpo protests and the Neo-Dada Organizers, both manifestations of social discontent with the existing institutions of Japan in 1960.

Around this time Akasegawa also made his Sheets of Vagina (1961/1994). For this piece Akasegawa assembled tire inner tubes, sliced open, folded and sewn together. The exposed, red inside of the inner tube can be said to evoke the image of human biology, in this case a female body. Centered near the top of the composition he placed a hub cab, producing a strange, semi-organic and semi-machinic assemblage. Through the use of discarded industrially manufactured materials, Akasegawa pointed to both the rapid development of postwar Japanese society to which he was responding as well as a “version of the mechanistic woman and the erotic machine, explored by Francis Picabia and Marcel Duchamp earlier in the century.” This latter theme can also be found in the photo-montage works of Akasegawa from around the same time. Another work from Akasegawa's so-called tire-works is Present Arrived Too Early (Hayaku tsukisugita purezento), a work whose relation to Man Ray's Gift (1921) Kuroda Raiji has cited to claim that “no matter how unusual his materials and themes may be, Akasegawa faithfully observed the orthodox constructs of ‘painting’ and ‘making.’”

=== Hi-Red Center ===
In 1963, Akasegawa formed the art collective Hi-Red Center with Jirō Takamatsu and Natsuyuki Nakanishi. The group's name was formed from the first kanji characters of the three artists' surnames: "high" (the "Taka" in Takamatsu), "red" (the "Aka" in Akasegawa), and "center" (the "Naka" in Nakanishi). Hi-Red Center's founding may be traced to a symposium on the relationship between art and political action that occurred November 1962 titled Signs of Discourse on Direct Action, in which all three members participated. The three artists of Hi-Red Center were all featured in Room in Alibi (Fuzai no Heya, July 1963), the Yusuke Nakahara-curated inaugural exhibition of Naiqua Gallery in Tokyo, where they all exhibited works as individual artists. For this exhibition, Akasegawa presented a chair, electric fan, radio and carpet, items symbolic of Japan's growth as a modern, capitalist society, all wrapped in brown paper. This wrapping gesture was intended to provoke new forms of engagement with everyday objects, a curious way of “seeing” objects anew by obscuring them. The piece was also titled Room in Alibi (1963/1995).

All three artists had begun as painters but had turned to methods of “direct action” through Hi-Red Center, a term taken from prewar socialist agitators. With “direct action,” the artists meant to raise to consciousness the absurdities and contradictions of Japanese society. They achieved this through a variety of "events," "plans," and "happenings" such as Dropping Event (October 10, 1964), in which they heaved various objects front he roof of Ikenobo Kaikan hall. After dropping the objects they collected and packed them all into a suitcase, placing it in a public locker and sending the key to the locker to someone chosen at random from a phone book. For Shelter Plan (1964), they booked a room at the Imperial Hotel and invited guests to have themselves custom-fitted for a personal nuclear fallout shelter. Participants included Yoko Ono and Nam June Paik, and were photographed from six sides to create a quasi-medical document ostensibly meant for the outfitting of personal fallout shelters. The Movement for the Promotion for a Clean and Organized Metropolitan Area (abbreviated as Cleaning Event) occurred October 16, 1964, in which they dressed in goggles and lab coats, roped off small areas of public sidewalk and meticulously cleaned them to mock the efforts to beautify the streets in anticipation of the 1964 Tokyo Olympics. The group would dissolve only a year and a half after its inception, with Akasegawa recounting cryptically that “after Cleaning Event there was simply nothing left to do.”

Another notable event of Hi-Red Center's was the June 1964 Great Panorama Exhibition held at Naiqua Gallery. While this project took the more conventional form of an art exhibition than some of their other events, the exhibition itself blurred the boundaries between art and everyday life in ways that engaged the artists’ interest in “direct action.” For five days the exhibition was closed, with two pieces of wood nailed over the gallery door in an X-shaped barricade. The word “Closed” was written on a piece of paper and fastened to one of the pieces of wood. The exhibition remained this way until the final day on which an “opening” event was held. Members of the Tokyo art community as well as others, including Jasper Johns, attended this opening event in which the gallery was revealed to be full of empty cans. Among them were Akasegawa's Canned Universe (1964/1994) pieces, in which Akasegawa removed the labels of cans and placed them in the can's inner wall as to invert the can's “contents” to become the entire universe in a simple but clever gesture. Of these works, some cans were soldered shut and at other times their lids were left ajar, revealing the label lining the inner wall. For Akasegawa these canned universe pieces were necessarily part of a set. Because the cans “enclosed” the universe, including his other inverted cans within that universe, he created a paradoxical situation in which the cans “contained” each other simultaneously.

In March 1965, with the help of Fluxus member Shigeko Kubota, Hi-Red Center's activities were documented on a map of Tokyo and published through Fluxus newspaper no. 5. This Bundle of Events was sold as a crumpled bundle of paper tied together by rope.

=== "Model One Thousand-Yen Note Incident" ===
In May 1963, Akasegawa sent out invitations to The Fifth Mixer Plan, Hi-Red Center's first gallery exhibition at Dai-Ichi Gallery in Tokyo. The announcement was delivered to several close friends in a cash envelope sent through the postal service. The announcement itself was a 1,000-yen note reproduced in monochromatic colors on the front with relevant information regarding the exhibit on the back. Thereafter, he used printed sheets of the copied note as wrapping paper to wrap a variety of everyday objects for a series of artworks called Packages.

Akasegawa's note was first discovered by the Japanese authorities during a raid on the houses of members of the radical leftist group Hanzaisha Domei (League of Criminals). The police were investigating an allegedly pornographic photograph in a book titled Akai Fusen Aruiwa Mesuokami No Yoru (Red Balloon, or Night of the She-Wolf). During the raid the police found Akasegawa's printed note, which was also featured in the book. As the book was only printed to be circulated among friends, the evidence should not have been prosecuted. However, because Hanzaisha Domei was monitored by the authorities as “ideologically perverse” (shisoteki henshitsu-sha), members of the group were arrested and the news was publicized in major newspapers and weekly magazines. Hi-Red Center was also labeled as ideologically perverse by Japanese authorities. Asahi newspaper reported Akasegawa's case as a headlining story on January 26, 1964, connecting it to the recent and high-profile “Chi-37” case of banknote counterfeiting discovered in circulation in the Japanese economy.

Akasegawa was indicted for creating imitations of banknotes, in violation of the 1895 Law to Regulate the Imitation of Currency and Bond Certificates. He was charged with the crime of "copying" (mozō), i.e. the simulation of currency, which was a lesser charge than actual counterfeiting, but nonetheless quite serious. The language of the law was vague, prohibiting any manufacture or sale of objects with an exterior front that might “be confused for currency or securities.” Akasegawa countered that rather than "copying" (mozō), he was merely "modeling" (mokei) the notes, just as one would create a model airplane. He developed this theory of “modeling” in response to the concept of counterfeiting as defined by Japanese law immediately after he gave depositions to the Tokyo Metropolitan Police in January 1964.

In August 1966, Akasegawa's initial trial and numerous appeals began; the entire process would last until 1970. Akasegawa treated the entire incident as a work of performance art or a happening, and spoke of it as he would speak of his physical artworks, dubbing it the Model Thousand-Yen Note Incident. Resulting from the trial was also the so-called Exhibition Event at the Courtroom, which occurred August 1966. Here, the evidence exhibited during the thirty five minute review turned the courtroom into a kind of gallery space. This happening of sorts was documented by a court photographer. During the trial, numerous well-known artists who were Akasegawa's friends and associates testified on his behalf. Together, they appropriated the courtroom as a space for artistic production and debate on the meaning of art. Akasegawa recorded his thoughts and experiences as the trials were proceeding in a series of essays published in 1970 in the collection titled Obuje o motta musansha (The Proletarian Carrying an Objet).

The case also produced the 1,000-Yen Note Incident Discussion Group, where intellectuals and artists could discuss the questions raised by the trial and the strategy of Akasegawa's defense. The case hinged on two difficult questions: first, whether Akasegawa's model thousand-yen note constituted "art," and second, whether that art was protected free expression and therefore not a crime. The argument taken up by Akasegawa's defense, that the reproduction of the banknote constituted an act of art, ironically contradicted his prior artistic activities that had actively tried to escape the confines of art through the concept of public invisibility he called “namelessless” (mumeisei). Ultimately, the court decided that the note was in fact art, but that producing that art also constituted a criminal act. In June 1967, Akasegawa was found guilty and given a lenient three-month suspended sentence. He appealed twice but exhausted his final appeal when the Supreme Court of Japan ruled against him in 1970.

Following the guilty verdict of the Model 1,000-Yen Note Incident, Akasegawa's first project was to produce 0 yen notes which he exchanged for 300 yen. This Greater Japan Zero-Yen Note (1967) project was a playful, law-abiding response on the charges of which he had just been convicted. The gesture, however, contained a radical idea in that the exchange of 0 yen notes for his price of 300 yen would, when brought to its logical conclusion, cause the economy to malfunction.

=== Photographic Activity and Thomassons ===
In 1970 Akasegawa was appointed to teach at the Bigakkō art school. Here with his students he began to explore what he referred to as chōgeijutsu ("hyperart") and what would later lead to the coining of "Thomassons." These activities arose from jokingly likening odd urban phenomena to conceptual art gestures, such as stairs leading to an entrance that had since been removed. The term "Thomasson" was a jocular reference to the baseball player Gary Thomasson, who was recruited to the Tokyo Giants on an exorbitant salary but was rarely able to hit the ball. These Thomassons were often categorized by Akasegawa, such as “Atomic Thomassons” to describe the ghostly traces of things removed from their contexts, or “Sada Abe Thomassons” ascribed to truncated telephone poles and named after an infamous Japanese woman who had severed her lover's genitalia with a kitchen knife. The term “Thomasson” was even used by science fiction writer William Gibson to describe a bridge that had become taken over by squatters, turning it into a “junk sculpture.” The classes Akasegawa taught at Bigakkō produced the Thomasson Observation Center, whose activity was serially published in Super Photo Magazine (Shashin Jidai). Here Akasegawa also invited readers to submit their own Thomassons, promising a reward of a zero-yen note.

Thomassons aimed to discover “art” within the everyday and inverted the artistic development of the readymade. Akasegawa commented upon in his “The Objet after Stalin,” writing that although “we usually think of a urinal as something whose sole mission is to receive our urine and conduct it to the sewage,” Marcel Duchamp’s gesture of bringing a urinal into an art context “stripped us from our intrinsic power as managers and rulers of the urinal, thus setting it free.” By this liberation of the urinal, Duchamp “consequently fills up with freedom also his own head. The title objet was born under this condition of reciprocal liberation.”

In January 1986, Akasegawa and his collaborators, Terunobu Fujimori, Shinbo Minami, Tetsuo Matsuda, Tsutomu Ichiki, and Joni Hayashi, met with Geijutsu Shincho editor Takeshita Tachibana to announce the formation of a new group: Rojō Kansatsu Gakkai (Street Observation Society), abbreviated as Rojō. The group combined its members’ individual affinities with “modernology,” a term coined by Wajiro Kon and Kenkichi Yoshida in their Kogengaku (Modernology). This placed Rojō in a “Japanese lineage of amateur investigators of material culture and everyday life,” such as Kon's documentation of the “behaviors and living environments of a rapidly modernising Japanese society.” As such, Rojō broadened the scope of inquiry to incorporate Akasegawa's interest in Thomassons into the broader context of modern Japanese life.

Akasegawa was fond of old cameras, especially Leicas, and from 1992 to around 2009, he joined Yutaka Takanashi and Yūtokutaishi Akiyama in the photographers' group Raika Dōmei, which held numerous exhibitions.

=== Fiction, Manga, and Other Pursuits ===
As "Katsuhiko Otsuji," he received the Akutagawa Prize in 1981 for his short story, "Chichi ga kieta" (Father Disappeared). In addition to fiction, Akasegawa is known for his essays and manga written with characteristic humor and style. He is perhaps best known by the general public for his 1998 book Rōjin Ryoku (Geriatric Power), which was a bestseller in Japan. In this book he argues that the physical and mental decline that accompanies old age is in fact proof of increased strength.

Akasegawa also produced manga, most notably The Sakura Illustrated (Sakura Gaho) in the 70s. This manga was first serialized in the weekly Asahi Journal from August 1970 to March 1971.

=== Death ===
Akasegawa died on October 26, 2014, in Tokyo, aged 77.

== Works ==
=== Publications ===
- Obuje o motta musansha (オブジェを持った無産者). Tokyo: Gendai Shisōsha, 1970.
- Tuihō sareta yajiuma (追放された野次馬). Tokyo: Gendai Hyōronsha, 1972.
- Sakura gahō gekidō no sen nihyaku gojū ichi (桜画報・激動の千二百五十日). Tokyo: Seirindō, 1974.
- Yume dorobō: Suimin hakubutsushi (夢泥棒：睡眠博物誌). Tokyo: Gakugei Shorin, 1975.
- Chōgeijutsu Tomason (超芸術トマソン). Tokyo: Byakuya Shobō, 1985. Revised: Tokyo: Chikuma Shobō, 1987. ISBN 4-480-02189-2. English translation: Hyperart: Thomasson. New York: Kaya Press, 2010. ISBN 978-1-885030-46-7.
- Tōkyō mikisā keikaku (東京ミキサー計画). Tokyo: Parco, 1984. Reissue: Tokyo: Chikuma Shobō, 1994. ISBN 4-480-02935-4.
- Rōjinryoku (老人力). Tokyo: Chikuma Shobō, 1998, ISBN 978-4-480-81606-1. Reissue: Chikuma Shobō, 2001, ISBN 978-4-480-03671-1.
