= Iimura Takahiko =

Japanese filmmaker (1937–2022)

Takahiko Iimura
- 飯村 隆彦
- Born: 20 February 1937; Tokyo, Japan
- Died: 31 July 2022 (aged 85)
- Occupation: Film director

Takahiko Iimura (Japanese: 飯村隆彦, Hepburn: Iimura Takahiko; 20 February 1937 – 31 July 2022) was a post-war Japanese avant-garde filmmaker and fine art artist. He is considered one of the pioneers of experimental and independent filmmaking in Japan. He focused on the sexuality of human bodies, film construction in Japanese culture. Iimura was born in Tokyo and was a graduate of Keio University.

He began experimenting the combination of human body and contemporary Japanese art subject in his early stage. In his film A Dance Party in the Kingdom of Lillput (1964) focuses on the movement and the intimate body parts - oral cavity and bare feet. The film Onan (1963) has gained him success and earn a global reputation by winning the Special Prize at the Brussels International Independent Film Festival in 1964.

Later after his success from his first international solo exhibition in the 70s, he switched his attention from human sexuality to exploring the new forms of film structure. Cosmic Buddha (1960-1971), Iimura re-shot from the screen introducing the infinite space within the footage, questioning the issue of space and time. The film concerns the philosophical and religious aspects of Japanese culture.

He published a seminal work on experimental filmmaking in 1970, Geijutsu to higeijutsu no aida, and a biography of Yoko Ono, Ono Yōko hito to sakuhin, in 1985. Iimura made much of his film in New York City, but became a professor at the Nagoya Zokei University of Art & Design in 1992.

== Filmography ==
=== 1960s ===
- "Film Poems," (1962–1970, 16mm)
- "Iro" (Colors), (1962, 16mm (from 8mm), Music: Yasunao Tone, 8 min.)
- Ai (Love) (1962, 10 min.)
- Onan (1963, 16mm, B/W, 7min., Music: Yasunao Tone; Winner, Special Prize, Brussels International Film Festival)
- "Taka and Ako," (1966, 16mm (from 8mm), black and white, silent, 16fps, 15 min.)
- "White Calligraphy," (1967, 16mm, black and white, silent, 11 min.)
- "Filmmakers," (1968, 28 min.)

=== 1970s ===
- "Kiri" (Fog), (1970, 16mm (from 8mm), black and white, silent, 16fps, 7 min.)
- "Film Strips I," (1970, 16mm, black and white, silent, 11.5 min.)
- "The Pacific Ocean" (1971, 16mm, colour, silent, 11 min.)
- "Self Identity" (1972, 1 min.)
- "Double Portrait" (1973–1987, 5 min.)
- "I Love You" (1973–1987, 4.5 min.)
- "Double Identity" (1979, 1.5 min.)

=== 1980s ===
- "I Am A Viewer, You Are A Viewer" (1981, 4 min.)
- "This Is A Camera Which Shoots This" (1982–1995, 5 min.)
- "Air’s Rock" (portmanteau, DVD, including Moments at the Rock, (1984, color, sound, 12 min.) and A Rock in the Light (1985/2008, 18 min. Music: Haruyuki Suzuki, 2008))
- New York Hotsprings (1984, DVD, b/w, 10 min. Part of Experiments in New York)
- "TV Confrontation" (1986, DVD, color, stereo, 5 min. with Tetsuya fukui, "Video=Aleph")
- New York Day and Night (1989, DVD, color, Music: Takehisa Kosugi, 58 min.)

=== 1990s ===
- "As I See You You See Me" (1990–1995, 7 min.)
- PERFORMANCE/MYSELF (Or Video Identity) (portmanteau, 1972–1995, DVD, 7 pieces, total 29 min.)
