= Mieko Shiomi (composer) =

Japanese artist and composer

- 塩見 允枝子
- Born: 1938 (age 87–88); Okayama, Japan
- Other name: Shiomi Chieko (塩見千枝子)
- Occupations: musical composer, visual artist, musical performer
- Years active: 1960-
- Notable work: Spatial Poem, Water Music, Boundary Music, Endless Box, Events & Games

Mieko Shiomi (塩見 允枝子, Shiomi Mieko; born 1938) is a Japanese artist, composer, and performer who played a key role in the development of Fluxus. A co-founder of the seminal postwar Japanese experimental music collective Group Ongaku, she is known for her investigations of the nature and limits of sound, music, and auditory experiences. Her work has been widely circulated as Fluxus editions, featured in concert halls, museums, galleries, and non-traditional spaces, as well as being re-performed by other musicians and artists numerous times. She is best known for her work of the 1960s and early 1970s, especially Spatial Poem, Water Music, Endless Box, and the various instructions in Events & Games, all of which were produced as Fluxus editions. Now in her eighties, she continues to produce new work.

== Biography ==
=== Early Training and Group Ongaku ===
Mieko Shiomi was born in Okayama, Japan. She began music lessons as a child and studied music at Tokyo University of the Arts in 1957 under composers Yoshio Hasegawa and Minao Shibata, graduating in 1961. In 1960, while still a student, she co-founded Group Ongaku (Group Music) to explore improvisation and action. Members of this collective included Takehisa Kosugi, Shukou Mizuno, Mikio Tojima, and Gen’ichi Tsuge, with Yasunao Tone joining later.

Shiomi returned to Okayama in March 1962 after completing her bachelor's degree and a year of graduate study at the Tokyo University of the Arts. In a solo performance at the Okayama Cultural Center she performed her own new compositions alongside those of American composers John Cage and Morton Feldman. Between 1963 and 1964, she began to compose what she termed "action poems," eliminating musical notation from the score entirely in favor of verbal instructions to be interpreted by the performer.

=== Fluxus Life in New York ===
Several incidents connected Shiomi to Fluxus, leading George Maciunas to invite her to New York in 1964. Art historian Midori Yoshimoto explains that both Toshi Ichiyanagi and Yoko Ōno had mentioned Shiomi's work to Maciunas, and art historian Colby Chamberlain notes that a card in Maciunas' file records a recommendation of Shiomi from Toshi Ichiyanagi by letter, written after she performed in his concert at the Sogetsu Art Center, in January 1962. Shiomi further explains that while working on the action poems Mirror Piece and Endless Box in 1963, she made a trip to Tokyo where she was introduced to Nam June Paik by a mutual friend. Upon showing Paik her action poems, he promised to send her work to George Maciunas who was apparently so enamored of the work that he had it turned into the edition that funded her flight to New York.

From 1964 to 1965, Shiomi lived in New York City, working closely with George Maciunas and contributing to Fluxus events, editions, and communal life. Shiomi and Shigeko Kubota had flown over together on the same flight, and both initially lived near Maciunas's loft in Soho. As a result, Shiomi worked closely with Maciunas, Kubota, and Takako Saito, hosting communal fluxus dinners whose labor primarily ended up falling to the women, and producing Fluxus editions in the evenings until Kubota and Shiomi took up part-time evening work. After her arrival in New York, Maciunas continued to incorporate many of her works, such as Water Music (1965) and Disappearing Music for Face (1965), into Fluxus editions. His enthusiasm for incorporating her work into Fluxus editions secured her place as a seminal member of the loose collective, and has led many artists and musicians—both in and beyond Fluxus—to perform her work at both impromptu events and formal concerts.

While based in New York, Shiomi participated in several live performances, including the Perpetual Fluxfest at Washington Square Gallery in 1964 where she performed six pieces—Double Windows, Direction Event, Air Event, Passing Music, Water Music, and Disappearing Music for Face—which all incorporated audience participation, expanding the role of "performer" within her work. While living among other New York-based Fluxus artists, she also came to more actively re-conceive the boundaries of performance beyond formal events. Upon her arrival, Maciunas had secured temporary living arrangements for Kubota and Shiomi and helped them move extra furniture from his loft to theirs, in what Maciunas jokingly referred to as a "carrying event." She described her experience in New York as a time during which she "looked at various things in [her] daily life from different viewpoints and transformed them into nondaily actions (performance), and made a feedback of these actions into [her] daily life again."

=== Late 1960s ===
She returned to Japan in 1965 when she could no longer extend her tourist visa, but continued her relationship with Fluxus artists through mail art correspondence. She began her Spatial Poem series while still in New York. Shiomi solicited Fluxus members from all over the globe to participate by inviting them to respond to an instruction and the collected responses constituted the work. The nine Spatial Poems were published together in a booklet in 1975.

From 1965 to 1970 Mieko Shiomi lived in Tokyo and taught piano. Sometime between 1967 and '69 she changed her given name from Chieko to Mieko in accordance with Japanese onomancy (seimei handan), a shift reflected in some of the Fluxus editions from the late 1960s and early 1970s. Upon her return to Japan, Shiomi reconnected with members of the Japanese avant-garde, and remained active in the Tokyo art and music scene until her marriage in 1970. Her activities were particularly important for the development of the genre of intermedia in the late 1960s, as evidenced by her participation in key intermedia events including From Space to Environment and Cross Talk/Intermedia.

=== 1970s to Today ===
Upon her marriage in 1970, however, Shiomi's ability to travel regularly for rehearsals and performances was severely limited. She shifted her activities to what she could accomplish from her base of operations in Minoo, Osaka, completing much of the Spatial Poem series between 1970 and 1975. Music historian Miki Kaneda has described Shiomi's strategy of this time as a covertly feminist one, aimed at appropriating domestic technologies, such as the postal system, and adapting them toward her performative ends rather than breaking the constricting structures of the patriarchial order that chained her to the home. In Kaneda's words, "Shiomi’s Spatial Poems are a ‘submission to the inconvenience of the situation,’ but also a performative intervention into the ‘distribution of the sensible’ of her immediate surroundings."

After 1977, she returned to work on her own compositions but continued her links with Fluxus, including organizing the Fluxus Media Opera in Kobe in 1995 and participating in events and exhibitions that re-examined the legacies of Fluxus in the 1990s, 2000s, and 2010s. Once her children reached adulthood in the 1990s, she became more active, starting with a Fluxus Balance mail art collaboration series initiated in the early 1990s. She has also experimented more with electronic technology since the 1990s, most notably dealing with telephones and computer synthesized voices in the series of Fluxus Media Operas she produced from 1992 to 2001. Shiomi remains active, performing both older works and developing new artworks and performances, including collaborations. She currently lives and works in Minoo, Osaka.

== Artistic development ==
=== Group Ongaku ===
Group Ongaku formed in 1961 around a desire to reorient their attention toward improvisational elements that they felt had been lost in modern Western music, and "rediscover the meaning of music, which they thought had been minimized." Toward this end, Group Ongaku hosted performances by artists including John Cage, La Monte Young and George Brecht, and explored the possibilities of objets sonore or sound objects, a key element of Musique concrète. They pursued sounds that would stretch the meanings of both music and auditory experiences. Such non-musical sounds included a vacuum cleaner, radio, and kitchenware as well as experiments with magnetic audiotape. According to the artist:

This explosion of activity [of Group Ongaku] was characteristic of our insatiable desire for new sound materials and new definitions (redefinition) of music itself. Every week we discovered some new technique [or] method for playing a previously unthought-of 'objet sonor,' and argue endlessly about how to extend its use, and what relationships of sound structure could be created between each performer. We experimented with the various components of every instrument we could think of, like using the inner action and frame of the piano, or using vocal and breathing sounds, creating sounds from the (usually unplayable) wooden parts of instruments, and every conceivable device of bowing and pizzicato on stringed instruments. At times we even turned our hands to making music with ordinary objects like tables and chairs, ash trays and a bunch of keys.

During this time Shiomi was increasingly drawn to experiences that shifted attention away from the intentionality of "playing" instruments, and toward an awareness of the act of listening. Her 1961 compositions Mobile I, II, III extended performance off the stage and even outside of the performance hall, with performers positioned behind the stage curtain and in the lobby. This strategy was intended to draw attention to the spatial aspects of sound, inciting audiences to understand the constructed environment and thereby "destroy[ing] the hierarchical representation of a musically privileged space." In a related vein, it was during this time that Shiomi had the revelation while playing with keys during an improvisation session; her focus had shifted from finding ways to produce sounds to experiment with actions that produced sound incidentally. This was the line of investigation she took up upon Group Ongaku's dissolution in 1961.

=== Action poems ===
In 1962 Shiomi returned to her family home in Okayama, and found herself working in a different manner. Art historian Sally Kawamura states that Shiomi was inspired by her rural surroundings to compose works that could be performed in non-traditional settings including the out-of-doors. She began working on instructional pieces, composed of words invoking actions, which she termed "action poems." This approach grew out of her increasing doubt about the real nature of music, and her growing belief that its essence did not reside in sound waves per se, but rather in sensations of time that could include physical actions. While many of her "action poems" consisted of written imperatives, she also began making objects that visually and physically invoked action. Examples of these early "action poems" include Boundary Music, which instructed performers to "make the faintest possible sounds of a boundary condition," and Endless Box, a series of nested paper boxes Shiomi described as "a visual diminuendo" that performers could un-nest and manipulate. In 1963, Shiomi was introduced to George Brecht's event scores through Yoko Ōno and Ichiyanagi Toshi, and she recognized her work fell into a similar vein, thus she began referring to these works as "events." By the time she took up correspondence about her instructional scores with Maciunas, the name "event" stuck. Thus one of the first Fluxus editions of Shiomi's work published by Maciunas (with help from Takako Saito) was Events and Games of 1964: a box containing double-sided cards with Shiomi's instructional scores in English on one side and Japanese on the other.

=== Water Music ===
Although created in 1964 just before she went to New York, it was first performed during her time there, and exemplifies Shiomi's increased focus on audience participation as well as her new awareness of everyday actions as potential performances. The basic instructions read:

1. Give the water still form. 2. Let the water lose its still form.

After she performed the instructions privately with Maciunas in the form of offering and accepting cups of water to drink, Maciunas made an editioned series of printed bottles out of the instructions. It was performed using these bottles, which Shiomi passed around to audience members asking them to carry out instruction 2, at the Perpetual Fluxfest in New York in late 1964. She performed it again for Flux Week in September 1965, at Gallery Crystal in Tokyo. In the Tokyo version she interpreted the instructions in several ways, including drawing up water from a kiddie pool using syringes and other tools, and dripping water onto a glue-covered record. In the case of the record, which was rotating on a turntable, the act of dripping the glue dissolved it to reveal the record and gradually allow portions of the record to play. She again performed the work in 1992 at Xebec in Kobe, hitting the surface of water in several basins with upside-down cups. Shiomi's own variable interpretations of the instructions gesture toward the openness of the instructions, which many other performers have taken up in the interim.

Sally Kawamura argues that the strategy used in Water Music, which changes the participant/performer's attention to everyday experiences from a utilitarian perspective to a playful one, helps enliven everyday experiences beyond the performance. Kawamura sees this as an anti-consumerist gesture that places value on exploring and enjoying one's given environment as experience rather than focusing on production and consumption. Shiomi herself now sees the bottled version of Water Music as an exemplary instance of her concept of "transmedia," which she describes an artwork "continu[ing] its creative evolution by transferring from one medium to the next."

=== Spatial Poem ===
Shiomi launched what would become her best known and most ambitious work just before leaving New York in July 1965 by sending out instructions to a list of addresses George Maciunas kept on file of Fluxus-friendly individuals. Unlike most mail art at the time, what she sent out was not a work that others would simply receive, but rather a set of instructions to which she was soliciting responses. Through this simple conceit, Shiomi created performances that spanned geographic distance and time, addressing her growing concern with the privileging of traditional event dynamics that require everyone to simultaneously meet in the same architecturally delineated space.

The full series of Spatial Poem events are as follows (invitation texts can be seen on the MoMA's archives page):

Spatial Poem No. 1 (Word Event), 1965

Spatial Poem No. 2 (Direction Event), October 15–16, 1965

Spatial Poem No. 3 (Falling Event), until August 31, 1966

Spatial Poem No. 4 (Shadow Event), December 11–31, 1971

Spatial Poem No. 5 (Open Event), July 15, August 5, 1972

Spatial Poem No. 6 (Orbit Event), May 3–23, 1973

Spatial Poem No. 7 (Sound Event), March 5–6, 1974

Spatial Poem No. 8 (Wind Event), October 7–27, 1974

Spatial Poem No. 9 (Disappearing Event), June 2-July 22, 1975

The first four events were turned into Fluxus edition objects, namely a map with pins of responses for Word Event, an offset-printed graphic map of responses indicating directions and locations for Direction Event, a calendar from which pages could be ripped for Falling Event, and a microfilm with plastic viewer for Shadow Event. The full final set of responses were compiled by Shiomi into an editioned book in 1976, allowing a retrospective overview of the sets of events that comprised the Spatial Poem performances.

Art historian Jessica Lynne Santone sees Spatial Poem primarily as a window into Fluxus' networked community, serving "as an illustration of the process of community in formation, an event that is a function of the circulation of performance and document." Art historian Kristine Styles takes this a step further in claiming the work is a quintessentially Fluxus performance, creating "a sort of metaphysics of the dynamics of social exchange and human action that extends from the infra to the supra—from the personal to the political, from the regional to the international.” Music historian Miki Kaneda however, takes a cue from art historian Midori Yoshimoto's assertion that the work responded to the specific situation—a mother of two young children—Shiomi found herself in, in the early 1970s. Kaneda focuses on how Spatial Poem allowed Shiomi to remain active in Fluxus networks even after marrying and having to run a household in Osaka. Kaneda focuses on how Shiomi uses the technologies and media at hand for a busy housewife and mother outside of the art centers to redefine the parameters of performance, creating the possibility of domestic performances so as to allow her everyday experiences to serve as a continuation of her investigations into sound.

=== Technological interests ===
Shiomi was already experimenting with electronic media in the 1960s, using a theremin-like electric-wave instrument for her contribution to Ichiyanagi Toshi's 1961 performance at Sōgetsu Art Center, and employing electronic synthesizers in performances for the Intermedia festival she co-organized and the Cross Talk/Intermedia event, both in early 1969. Yet in the 1960s these uses of electronic technologies were intended more as a means of exploring the gaps between different media or bridging across traditionally distinct media, as signaled by her use of Dick Higgin's term "intermedia," rather than explicit content in her work. In the Fluxus Media Operas of the 1990s, she set narrative instructions against conflicting music triggered by electronic sensors, playing with the intelligibility of a voices in a performance using international phone calls and electronic synthesizers, or commissioning a text for performers to respond to that indicted the computer-synthesized voice.

== Select artworks ==
Mieko Shiomi composes events with music and environmental action. Selected works include:

- Mirror, 1963
- Boundary Music, 1963
- Event for the Midday in the Sunlight, 1963
- Endless Box, 1963–64
- Events and Games, 1964
- Shadow Piece II, 1964
- Air Event, 1964
- Water Music, 1964
- Disappearing Music for Face, flipbook, 1965
- Disappearing Music for Face, 1966 (Film, 16mm black and white, 11:41)
- Compound View no. 1, 1966
- Spatial Poems no. 1-no. 9, 1965–1975
- Flying Poem no. 2, 1989
- Balance Poem no. 1-no. 24, 1966–95

== Notable Performances and Events, and Exhibitions ==
Presentation of works by Ichiyanagi Toshi, sogetsu contemporary series/10, Sōgetsu Art Center, Tokyo, 30 November 1961

Sweet 16, Sogetsu Art Center, Tokyo, 3–5 December 1963

Fluxus Symphony Orchestra Concert, Carnegie Concert Hall, 27 June 1963

Perpetual Fluxfest, Washington Square Gallery, 30 October 1964

Monday Night Letter, Café au go go, NY, 30 November 1964

Flux Week, Gallery Crystal, Tokyo, 1965

From Space to Environment—Happening, Sōgetsu Art Center, Tokyo, 14 November 1966

Happening for Sightseeing Bus, various locations in Tokyo, 18 December 1966

Intermedia Art Festival, 18, 19 and 21 January, Killer Joe's Discotheque and Nikkei Hall, Tokyo, 1969 (co-organizer along with Takehisa Kosugi and Yasunao Tone)

Cross Talk/Intermedia, Yoyogi National Stadium, Tokyo, 5–7 February 1969

Deutsch-Japanische Woche: Notation of Contemporary Music, Osaka Goethe-Institute, Osaka, 1977

Festival Franco-Japonais de musique Contemporaine, l’Institute Franco-Japonais du Kansai, Kyoto, 1978

Japanese Composers ’79, Iino Hall, Tokyo, 1979

Concert & Marathon Sonic Environment: Pauline Oliveros & Deep Listening Band, Tokyo Pan, Tokyo, 1992

Fluxus Media Opera - Balance Poems, Xebec Hall, Kobe/Art Vivant, Tokyo, 10–11 July 1992

SeOUL- NymAX, The Courthouse Theater, New York, 13 October 1994

Fluxus Media Opera, Xebec Hall, Kobe, 24 July 1994

Neue Musik aus Japan, Felix Mendelssohn Bartholdy Hall, Leipzig, 2000

Media Opera part 3: Fluxus Trial, The National Museum of Art, Osaka, 2001

Music Today on Fluxus, National Museum of Art, Osaka, 7 July 2013

Fluxus in Japan 2014, Museum of Contemporary Art Tokyo, 2014

Fluxus wo kataru (On Fluxus, Talk, Symposium and Concert), Kyoto City University of Arts, Kyoto, 19 January 2019

== Select group exhibitions ==
Flux-Show, Gallery A, Amsterdam, 1976

Fluxus – Selections from The Gilbert and Lila Silverman Collection, Museum of Modern Art, New York, 1988

FluxAttitudes, The New Museum, New York, 1992

Yin & Yan, Fluxeum, Wiesbaden, 1992

In the Spirit of Fluxus, the Walker Art Center, Minneapolis; Whitney Museum of American Art, New York; the Museum of Contemporary Art, Chicago; the Wexner Center for the Visual Arts, Columbus. Ohio; the San Francisco Museum of Modern Art; and the Fundacio Antoni Tapies, Barcelona, 1993–94

Fluxus Media Pre-Exhibition, Xebec Hall, Kobe, 1994 (organizer)

Japanese Art After 1945: Scream Against the Sky, Guggenheim Museum, Soho, NY; Yokohama Museum of Art, Yokohama; San Francisco Museum of Modern Art, 1994

Fluxus Show, Kunsthalle Basel, Basel; The Watari Museum of Contemporary Art, Tokyo, 1994

L’INVENTION DU MONDE, Centre Pompidou, Paris, 2003

Japanese Women Artists in Avant-Garde Movements, 1950–1975, Tochigi Prefectural Museum of Fine Arts, Utsunomiya, 2005

Between Art and Life: Performativity in Japanese Art, Centre d'Art Contemporain Genève, 2008

DISSONANCES – Six Japanese Artists, Toyota Municipal Museum of Art, Toyota, Japan, 2008

Fluxus East, Künstlerhaus Bethanien, Berlin, Germany; Contemporary Art Centre, Vilnius, Lithuania; Bunkier Sztuki, Krakow, Poland; Ludwig Múzeum, Budapest, Hungary; Kumu Art Museum, Tallinn, Estonia; Kunsthallen Nikolaj, Copenhagen, Denmark; Henie Onstad Art Center, Høvikodden, Norway, 2007–2010

Staging Action: Performance in Photography since 1960, The Museum of Modern Art, New York, 2010

Fluxus at 50, Nassauischer Kunstverein, Wiesbaden, Germany, 2012

Tokyo 1955–1970: A New Avant-Garde, The Museum of Modern Art, New York, 2012

The House of Dust, James Gallery, Center for the Humanities, NY, 2016

JAPANORAMA, Centre Pompidou-Metz, Metz, France, 2017

Orgasmic Streaming - Organic Gardening - Electroculture, Chelsea Space, London, 2018

EXODUS I: A Colossal World: Japanese Artists and New York, 1950s – Present, WhiteBox, NY, 2018

Fluxus ABC, Galerie Krinzinger, Vienna, 2019

Body. Gaze. Power. A Cultural History of the Bath, Staatliche Kunsthalle Baden-Baden, Germany, 2020

Humor Has It, Nam June Paik Art Center, Gyeongju, South Korea, 2021

== Select Solo and Two-Person Exhibitions ==
Fluxus Balance & Balance Poems, Galerie J & J Donguy, Paris, 1995

Collagen und Multiples, Galerie & Edition Hundertmark, Cologne, 1998

New Works of Visual Poetry, Xebec Hall, Kobe, 2004

An Exhibition – An Event [Une exposition – un événement), Jeu de Paume, Paris, 2013

Mieko Shiomi & Fluxus, The National Museum of Art, Osaka, 2013

Mieko Shiomi & Takuma Uematsu: Exploring The Stars, Yumiko Chiba Associates, Tokyo, 2019

== Discography ==
Her work has been recorded and issued on cassettes and CDs, including:

- Requiem for George Maciunas (1990)
- An Incidental Story On The Day Of A Solar Eclipse #1#2#3 (1998, Edition Hundertmark)
- Fluxus Suite (A Musical Dictionary Of 80 People Around Fluxus) (2002, ? Records)
- Satoko Plays Mieko Shiomi—Fractal Freaks (2005, ? Records) *piano performed by Satoko Inoue
- The World Of Sounds And Words (2010, FONTEC)

== Collections ==
Archiv Sohm Staatgalerie Stuttgart, Germany

Centre Pompidou, France

Fondazione Bonotto, Vincenza, Italy

Fondazione Mudima, Italy

The Getty Research Institute, Los Angeles, CA

Kurashiki City Art Museum, Okayama, Japan

Museo Nacional Centro de Arte Reina Sofia, Madrid, Spain

Museo Vostell Malpartida, Spain

Museum of Modern Art, NY, USA

Museum of Contemporary Art Tokyo, Japan

Nam June Paik Art Center, Korea

The National Museum of Art, Osaka, Japan

The Niigata Prefectural Museum of Modern Art, Japan

Queensland Art Gallery, Australia

Urawa Art Museum, Saitama, Japan

Walker Art Center, Minneapolis, MN

Whitney Museum of American Art, NY, USA
