= Julia Bryan-Wilson =

American academic

- Occupations: Art historian, curator, author, academic
- Employer(s): Columbia University; Museu de Arte de São Paulo
- Known for: Art Workers: Radical Practice in the Vietnam War Era (2009); Fray: Art + Textile Politics (2017)
- Awards: Guggenheim Fellowship (2019); Robert Motherwell Book Award (2018); ASAP Book Prize (2018); Frank Jewett Mather Award (2018); Art Journal Award (2013)

Academic background
- Education: Swarthmore College (BA, 1995); University of California, Berkeley (PhD, 2004)
- Thesis: Art/Work: Minimalism, Conceptualism, and Artistic Labor in the Vietnam War Era, 1965-1975 (2004)

Academic work
- Discipline: Art history
- Institutions: Columbia University, University of California, Berkeley, Williams College, University of California, Irvine, Courtauld Institute of Art, London
- Main interests: feminist and queer theory; modern and contemporary art; craft histories; photography; video; collaborative practices; visual culture of the Atomic Age

Julia Bryan-Wilson is an American art historian and curator. Bryan-Wilson is Professor of Art History and Archaeology at Columbia University. She was previously the Doris and Clarence Malo Professor of Modern and Contemporary Art at the University of California, Berkeley. She received a Guggenheim Fellowship in 2019. Bryan-Wilson has been a curator-at-large at the Museu de Arte de São Paulo since 2019.

== Early life and education ==
Bryan-Wilson was born in Amarillo, Texas. Raised by a single mother, her father was a Vietnam War veteran. She came out as queer at the age of 15 in Houston, a city experiencing intense homophobia at the time, which she said influenced her activism. The HIV/AIDS crisis played a critical role in her activism and impacted her experience. Bryan-Wilson's early interests in art were informed by her experiences with activism and the queer feminist community.

Bryan-Wilson received her BA in English from Swarthmore College in 1995. After completing her undergraduate degree in literature, she pursued graduate studies in art history. She graduated with a Ph.D. from the University of California, Berkeley in 2004. In her early 20s, she worked with Miranda July on the DIY feminist video chainletter, Joanie 4 Jackie.

== Career ==
Bryan-Wilson joined Columbia University in 2022, when she became the first art history Professor of LGBTQ+ studies in the history of the university. Prior to her appointment at Columbia University, she became well known for her research on queer and feminist approaches to art, labor, and cultural production.

In addition to teaching at the University of California, Berkeley, Bryan-Wilson has also taught at the Rhode Island School of Design, the University of California, Irvine, and at the Courtauld Institute of Art, London. She also served as one of the Robert Sterling Clark Professors in the Graduate Art History department at Williams College from 2018 to 2019.

Bryan-Wilson studies feminist and queer theory, modern and contemporary art, craft histories, and questions of artistic labor, as well as photography, video, collaborative practices, and visual culture of the Atomic Age.

Her first major academic book, Art Workers: Radical Practice in the Vietnam War Era, published by the University of California Press in 2009, examined the politics of artistic labor in the 1960s and 1970s, particularly in feminist and Marxist contexts. It was named an outstanding book of the year by Artforum, Choice, and the New York Times. Bryan-Wilson's article, "Invisible Products," published in the Summer 2012 issue of Art Journal, received the 2013 Art Journal Award for Outstanding Article of the Year from the College Art Association.

Her second book, Fray: Art and Textile Politics, published by the University of Chicago Press in 2017, explores the role of handmade textiles in art history, drawing attention to the racialized and gendered labor involved in textile production. It also includes a critical analysis of the AIDS Quilt, incorporating queer perspectives into the narrative of art history. The book was awarded three major prizes: the 2018 Robert Motherwell Book Award by the Dedalus Foundation, the Book Prize from The Association for the Study of the Arts of the Present (or ASAP), and the 2019 Frank Jewett Mather Award from the College Art Association. Holland Cotter named it one of the best art books of the year in the New York Times.

Her third sole-authored book, Louise Nevelson's Sculpture: Drag, Color, Join, Face, focused on the Jewish Ukrainian-American sculptor Louise Nevelson, challenged traditional monographic approaches in art history by expanding the conversation around influence to include what she calls "queer aesthetic kinship". She studied Nevelsons fan art, treating it with the same respect as professional critiques, and emphasized the importance of examining the wide range of spaces in which an artists work circulates. It was awarded the Terra Foundation for American Art International Publication Award, 2022.

She is the editor of Robert Morris (October Files), published by the Massachusetts Institute of Technology in 2013. With Glenn Adamson, Byran-Wilson is also the co-author of Art in the Making: Artists and their Materials from the Studio to Crowdsourcing (1st Edition), published by Thames & Hudson in June 2016.

=== Curatorial activity ===
With Andrea Andersson, Bryan-Wilson co-curated the first traveling exhibition of Cecilia Vicuña: About to Happen at the Contemporary Arts Center in New Orleans in 2017. The show traveled to the Institute for Contemporary Art at the University of Pennsylvania in February 2019, the Henry Art Gallery in Seattle, the Berkeley Art Museum, and MOCA North Miami.

In 2024, Bryan-Wilson chaired the international jury of the 60th Venice Biennale.

== Publications ==
=== Books ===
- Bryan-Wilson, Julia (2011). Art Workers: Radical Practice in the Vietnam War Era. University of California Press. ISBN 978-0-520-25728-3. OCLC 313018234.
- Bryan-Wilson, Julia (2017). Fray: Art + Textile Politics. University of Chicago Press. ISBN 978-0-226-07781-9. OCLC 967727523.
- Bryan-Wilson, Julia (2023). Louise Nevelson's Sculpture: Drag, Color, Join, Face. Yale University Press.

=== Edited books and journal editions ===
- Bodies of Resistance exhibition catalogue; editor, with Barbara Hunt. Hartford, CT: Real Art Ways/Visual AIDS, 2000
- Bryan-Wilson, J. (Ed.). (2013). Robert Morris (Vol. 15). MIT Press.
- Bryan-Wilson, J., & Piekut, B. (2020). Amateurism. Third Text, 34(1), 1-21. doi:10.1080/09528822.2019.1682812
- Bryan-Wilson, J., González, J., & Willsdon, D. (2016). Editors' introduction: Themed issue on visual activism. Journal of Visual Culture, 15(1), 5-23. doi:10.1177/1470412915619384
- Jackson, S., & Bryan-Wilson, J. (2016). Time Zones: Durational Art and Its Contexts. Representations, (136), 1-20. JSTOR 26420575

=== Selected book chapters ===
- Bryan-Wilson, Julia. "Against the Body: Interpreting Ana Mendieta." In Transnational Perspectives on Feminism and Art, 1960-1985, pp. 139–153. Routledge, 2021.
- Baum, K., Griffey, R., Brown, M. A., Bryan-Wilson, J., & Temkin, S. V. (2021). Alice Neel: people come first. Metropolitan Museum of Art.
- Lewallen, C., Moss, K., Bryan-Wilson, J., & Rorimer, A. (2011). State of Mind: New California Art Circa 1970. Univ of California Press.

=== Selected articles ===
- Bryan-Wilson, J. (2003). Remembering Yoko Ono's" Cut Piece". Oxford Art Journal, 99–123. JSTOR 3600448
- Bryan-Wilson, J., & July, M. (2004). Some kind of grace: An interview with Miranda July. Camera Obscura, 19(1), 180–197.
- Bryan-Wilson, J. (2007). Hard hats and art strikes: Robert Morris in 1970. The Art Bulletin, 89(2), 333–359. doi:10.1080/00043079.2007.10786345
- Foster, H., Bryan-Wilson, J., Kester, G., Elkins, J., Kwon, M., Shannon, J., ... & Mcdonough, T. (2009). Questionnaire on" The Contemporary". October, 130, 3–124. JSTOR 40368571
- Bryan-Wilson, J. (2012). Occupational realism. TDR/The Drama Review, 56(4), 32–48. doi:10.1162/DRAM_a_00212
- Bryan-Wilson, J. (2012). Dirty commerce: Art work and sex work since the 1970s. differences, 23(2), 71–112. doi:10.1215/10407391-1629821
- Bryan-Wilson, J. (2013). Eleven propositions in response to the question:"What is contemporary about craft?". The Journal of Modern Craft, 6(1), 7–10. doi:10.2752/174967813X13535106841485
- Bryan-Wilson, J., & Dunye, C. (2013). Imaginary archives: A dialogue. Art Journal, 72(2), 82–89. doi:10.1080/00043249.2013.10791037
- Bryan-Wilson, J. (2015). Simone Forti goes to the zoo. October, (152), 26–52. doi:10.1162/OCTO_a_00215
- Bryan-Wilson, J. (2012). Practicing" Trio A.". October, (140).
- Bryan-Wilson, J. (2014). "Out to See Video": EZTV's Queer Microcinema in West Hollywood. Grey Room, (56), 58–89. doi:10.1162/GREY_a_00150
- Bryan-Wilson, J. (2019). queer-homophobia Bruce Nauman: queer homophobia. Burlington Contemporary.
- Brizuela, N., & Bryan-Wilson, J. (2021). Speaking of Lotty Rosenfeld:"Gestures Dangerous, Simple, and Popular". October, (176), 111–137. doi:10.1162/octo_a_00429/102629
