= Hitoshi Nakazato =

Japanese-born American artist (1936–2010)

- 中里斉
- Born: March 15, 1936; Machida, Tokyo, Japan
- Died: July 17, 2010 (aged 74); New York City, New York, United States
- Other name: Nakazato Hitoshi
- Education: Tama Art University (BA), University of Wisconsin (MS), University of Pennsylvania (MFA)
- Occupations: Painter, printmaker, muralist, educator
- Website: https://www.hitoshinakazato.com

Hitoshi Nakazato (Japanese: 中里斉; 1936 – 2010) was a Japanese-born American painter, printmaker, muralist, and educator.

== Early life and education ==
Hitoshi Nakazato was born in 1936, in Machida, Tokyo. Nakazato grew up in post-World War II Japan. His mother came from a family that owned an indigo dying shop. The formative childhood memories of rows of dyed fabrics hanging to dry influenced his later works. He graduated from J.F. Oberlin Jr. High School and Oberlin Highschool.

He graduated at Tama Art University in Tokyo, majoring in Western Painting in 1960; there he studied under Shosuke Osawa. Upon graduating he worked in Hokkaido for the Hokkaido Times for half a year as an art journalist and then returned to J. F. Oberlin to teach art. After teaching for two years. Nakazato continued his art studies at the University of Wisconsin (MS 1966), and the University of Pennsylvania (MFA), where he studied with Piero Dorazio and Neil Welliver.

== Career ==
He received the John. D. Rockefeller III Fund Grant, and lived in New York City from 1966 to 1968. After he returned to Japan to become a professor at the Tama Art University, and assist in Komai Tetsuro's printmaking classes. At the time the Tama Art University faculty included, Yoshishige Saito, Jiro Takamatsu, Tono Yoshiaki, Lee U-Fan, Nakahara Yusuke, and Haryu Ichiro. Nakazato left Tama Art University in the wake of the student uprising and returned to the United States.

Nakazato had his first solo exhibition in Tokyo at the Pinar Gallery in 1970. He painted a 5-meter x 25 meter mural at the Furukawa Pavilion at 1970 World Exposition in Osaka. In 1971, he was selected for the Japan Art Festival Exhibition at the Guggenheim Museum in New York. He held six solo exhibitions at Tokyo Gallery through his connection with Yoshishige Saito. In 1987, he had a solo museum exhibitions at the Hara Museum of Contemporary in Tokyo. In 2010, the Machida City Museum of Graphic Arts held a large scale solo exhibition.

He lived in Manhattan until his death on July 17, 2010. He died after a fall on July 17, 2010, at Bellevue Hospital in New York City.

== Exhibitions ==
His works have been included in various group exhibitions and has held numerous solo exhibitions. The following are a few examples. His first solo exhibition was held at St. James Gallery in Milwaukee in 1966. In 1970, Nakazato has his first solo exhibition in Japan at the Pinar Gallery in Akasaka Tokyo. He received an award from the Japanese Minister of Education for a work he contributed to The 5th Japan Art Festival Domestic Exhibition. In the same year, works were exhibited in a group show at the Yokohama Civic Art Gallery, the Guggenheim Museum, and Philadelphia Civic Center. The next year his works are included in a group exhibition at the Tokyo Metropolitan Art Museum. He had solo exhibitions at Tokyo Gallery in 1977, 1979, 1982, 1989, 1993, and 1997. Hara Museum of Contemporary Art, Tokyo in 1987. 1999 International Invitational Works on Paper Exhibition at the University of Hawaii. The Arthur Ross Gallery at the University of Pennsylvania in 2007. He had a large-scale retrospective solo exhibition at the Machida City Museum of Graphic Arts in 2010.

== Collections ==
- Museum of Modern Art, New York City, New York, United States
- Pennsylvania Academy of Fine Art, Philadelphia, Pennsylvania, United States
- Rhode Island School of Design Museum, Providence, Rhode Island, United States
- National Museum of Modern Art, Kyoto, Kyoto, Japan
- Hyogo Museum of Modern Art, Kobe, Japan
- Brooklyn Museum of Art, New York City, New York, United States
- The National Museum of Art, Osaka
- Museum of Contemporary Art, Tokyo
- The Museum of Modern Art, Kamakura & Hayama
- Shizuoka Prefectural Museum of Art
- Setagaya Art Museum, Tokyo, Japan
- The Museum of Modern Art, Wakayama
- Birmingham Museum of Art, Birmingham, Alabama, United States
