= Hi-Red Center =

Japanese artist collective

Hi-Red Center (ハイレッド・センター, Haireddo Sentā) was a Japanese artistic collective, founded in May 1963 and consisting of artists Genpei Akasegawa, Natsuyuki Nakanishi, and Jirō Takamatsu, that organized and performed anti-establishment happenings. Taking the urban environment of Tokyo as their canvas, the group sought to create interventions that blurred the lines between art and everyday life and raised questions about centralized authority and the role of the individual in society.

Later considered to have been one of the most prominent and influential Japanese art groups of the 1960s, Hi-Red Center never officially disbanded, but their happening Cleaning Event in October 1964 proved to be their final artistic action.

== Formation ==
Akasegawa had previously participated in the short-lived Neo-Dada Organizers, a similar art collective focused on performance art and happenings. Nakanishi and Takamatsu worked together to stage Yamanote Line Incident (1962) (detailed below) in October 1962, subsequently participating in the "Signs of Discourse on Direct Action" symposium sponsored by Keishō art magazine held November that year, with Akasegawa as an interloctor. The symposium examined the relationship between artistic and political action, and allowed the three artists to reflect on the waning of political activity in Japan. All three artists had begun as painters but would embrace methods of “direct action” in their work with Hi-Red Center, borrowing a term from prewar socialist agitators. With “direct action,” the artists meant to raise to consciousness the absurdities and contradictions of Japanese society. This interest in Art as direct action has been contextualised as rooted in the atmosphere following massive Anpo protests against the U.S.-Japan Security Treaty in 1960. They were united to move toward “events” for an “uneventful” time.

These discussions at the symposium led the artists to work together again to present their three-person show, "Fifth Mixer Plan," at the Dai-Ichi Gallery in Shinjunku and thus found the group Hi-Red Center in May 1963. The name "Hi-Red Center" was derived from the first kanji characters of their surnames: “高, taka” (high), “赤, aka” (red), and “中, naka” (center).

== Collective Practice ==
Hi-Red Center is known for "breaking away from the urban centrality of the Tokyo art scene and the focus on the museum/gallery as the core location for the production and consumption of art." By staging these events in the public realm, they acted anonymously while breaching the boundary between art and life. Their happenings were not a mere displacement of art to the streets, but inherently reshaped the relationship between objects and performance. Akasegawa in particular questioned the ways in which objects, actions, and environments gained coherence in relationship to each other and how artistic intervention acts could disrupt this. Furthermore, they wished to pronounce how their small gestures and ordinary objects were intertwined with inherent “structures” (as Nakanishi called them) or “systems” (as Akasegawa called them in Capitalist Realism), such as newspapers, currency, commodity circulation, train lines, and public sanitation. Shigeko Kubota and George Maciunas' edited map sheet Bundle of Events (1965) represents the corpus of the group's city interventions on a notational cartographic form, implying the confluence of their activities with the urban landscape.

While the group is associated with the Fluxus movement (and its Japanese counterparts), art historian Reiko Tomii suggests it would be a mistake to interpret it through the history and confines Euro-American movements. Instead, Hi-Red Center's activities can be seen to follow the demise of Anti-Art (Han-geijutsu) in Japan (in the 1960s), which can be traced to the phenomenon called "Informel Whirlwind," a Japanese version of gestural abstraction. Hi-Red Center prefigured collaborative collectivism, bridging Anti-Art to Non-Art (Hi-geijutsu) movements (in the 1970s), with Anti-Art collectivism being more viscerally driven and Non-Art collectivism more cerebrally engaged. These artists' experimentations with form can be characterised as the dematerialization of art, comparable to global developments of conceptual and post-minimalist art.

Anti-Art gained popularity in the Japanese vanguard art scene through the annual Yomiuri Indépendant Exhibition (1949-1963), the annual exhibition where Hi-Red Center (and other collectives such as Kyushu-ha, Group Ongaku, Zero Dimension [Zero Jigen], Jikan-ha [Time School]) were active. Artists at the Yomiuri Indépendant Exhibition “advocated making junk art and violent demonstrations to protest the conventional practice of art”, degrading Art's status as rarefied objects to commonplace items. Reiko Tomii notes that Hi-Red Center treated this redefinition of the position of Art more directly, enabling Art to descend to everyday life by making everyday life and spaces the site of their work. The group had suspicions about the constraints of traditional art exhibition spaces—“what is offered to the public, at which venue, by whom, under what circumstances, resulting in what reception?”.

Art historian Reiko Tomii argues that the shift from the display of objects in an exhibition format to the installation and organisation of “Happenings” (hapuningu), “events” (ivento), and “rituals” (gishiki) in "extraexhibtion projects" required extensive collaboration inter and intra collectives. Thus, Hi-Red Center's form of Anti-Art practice can also be said to be postmodern, in its questioning of the notions of sole authorship, individualism and originality in modern art.

Akasegawa referred to the group's work as "secret art", with no "officially fixed form" and existing "in the form of rumours". This reflected the Happenings event nature of their work, despite requiring prior planning by the group members. However, this quality of secrecy was influenced by the group being consisted of anonymous members that participated in the organisation of events, without being officially credited. Even the group's name was intended to form a was a fictional character called Mr. "Hi Red Center", similar to Marcel Duchamp’s Rrose Sélavy.

== Events ==
Other events not detailed below include Waseda University Event (November 22, 1962), where the group painted the urinals of a lecture hall at Waseda University’s red, and Ropology (August 1963).

=== Yamanote Line Incident (October 18, 1962) ===
Staged on 18 October 1962, Natsuyuki and Takamatsu boarded a Yamanote loop line train heading counter-clockwise on its route, disrupting the normalcy of passenger's commutes through a series of performative actions. While this event was staged prior to the official formation of the group, it demonstrates the core ethos of their subsequent works from 1963 onwards.

Nakanishi positioned himself in the centre of the train carriage, his face painted white and seemingly absorbed in a book. He carried Compact Objects or objets, transparent forms about the size and shape of an ostrich egg, with sundry or "junk" items such as wristwatches, bits of rope, sunglasses, bottle caps and human hair encased in resin. Nakanishi proceeded to lick his objects, also shining a flashlight upon onlooker’s faces to observe their reactions. Prior to boarding the carriage at Ueno Station, Takamatsu had unravelled his 3.5 km long Point-string, knotted with similar domestic objects, on the station platform. Later, he stood on the side of the carriage, reading a newspaper with holes in them. Other participants, such as Murata Kiichi, applied white face paint and brought additional objects, including rope, real eggs and a chicken foot. Murai Tokuji documented the happening with photography, depicting the puzzled expressions of commuters watching Nakanishi. Akasegawa was also present as a photographer.

William Marotti characterizes this work as an intervention into quietness (or calmness), Nakanishi and Genpei situating the work in the wake of large-scale post-war upheavals (such as the 1960 Anpo US–Japan Security Treatyprotests). They saw the train systems as a "terrain of the everyday", using the individual bodies of the artists to demonstrate how these symbolic events have long-lasting effects on the citizen body, long after public political discourse and dissent wanes. Thus, this quietness or calmness is qualified on the level of public consciousness, rather than a literal silence or emptiness. The choice of staging the event on the Yamanote loop, one of the busiest commuter lines, demonstrates this prioritisation. Their choice of setting can also be attributed to the larger desire for “direct action” (chokusetsu kodo), in the wake of waning public protests post-Anpo.

Mark Pendleton argues that this work, and its form of intervention into the everyday, has influenced the ethos of subsequent collectives in the 1970s, such as Video Earth Tokyo. The collective also situated their work in the Tokyo train system, installing a dining table and hosting a meal on a subway carriage in Shukutaku ressha/Video Picnic (1975).

=== Fifth Mixer Plan (May 7–12, 1963) ===
Fifth Mixer Plan was the three person exhibition that led to the founding of the group, and was staged in May 1963 at the Dai-Ichi Gallery in Shinjunku. The three artists presented some of their seminal individual works; Takamatsu exhibited String Continue On and On and Akasegawa exhibited Wrapped Objects.

=== Sixth Mixer Plan (May 28–29, 1963) ===
This event was held on May 28–29 at Gallery Naiqua, inaugurating the space. The group (and its members) had frequently worked and exhibited in Naiqua (内科; internal medicine) Gallery, and continued to do so individually after their disbanding. Nakanishi was childhood friends with the owner, Miyata Kunio, and influenced him to open the rental gallery (kashi garo). Thus, they did not have to pay any rental fees when they used the space.

Presenting what would become one of his most famous works, Nakanishi staged Sentaku basal wa kakuhan koi wo shucho suru (Clothes Pegs Assert Churning Action), walking around in the square in front of the Shinbashi rail station, covered with metal clothespins and carrying balloons. These common clothespins were attached en-masse to canvas, clothing and human flesh. The work had previously been staged at the March 1963 Yomiuri Indépendant Exhibition.

Nakanishi conceived of the work as interactive, allowing the passerby audience to participate by taking the clothespins off or putting them on. The audience reacted to the work in bemusement, without realising the physical pain Nakanishi had subjected himself to. The group also made suits out of balloons for performers on the streets of Tokyo.

=== News Flash! Who is Using the Communication Satellite? (April 1964) ===
The group published a set of leaflets titled News Flash! Who is Using the Communication Satellite? (Tokuhō! Tsūshin eisei wa nanimono ni tsukawarete iru ka!) in April 1964. This project highlights the coincidence between the TV broadcast as well as the assassination of John F. Kennedy and an attempted assassination of the U.S. ambassador to Japan Edwin Reischauer. The leaflets hinted at a possible third assassination of French President Charles de Gaulle in light of the upcoming broadcast testing between Japan and Europe.

The group was commenting on how the apparatus of media functions in a capitalist society, namely how news reportage preceded the event.

=== Imperial Hotel Body: Shelter Plan (January 1964) ===
Shelter Plan was an invite-only event staged at Tokyo’s Imperial Hotel in January 1964. The event was titled to be reminiscent of 1950s bombing drills.

56 guests, including artists such as Masao Adachi, Mieko Shiomi, Kazakura Shō, Tadanori Yokoo, Kawani Hiroshi, Yoko Ono and Nam June Paik, were invited into the Hi-Red Center suite to have their measurements taken, on the pretence of customising one-person nuclear bomb shelters. The process of inspecting each guest, despite them having received an invitation card and an instruction card, was intended to be alienating and objectifying, as though they had been arrested. The instructions included the following steps:

Guests were to enter the hotel through the front door, to wear a tie and gloves, and to bring a bag. They were also asked not to leave any fingerprints in the hotel lobby. Once they were invited upstairs and entered the hotel room, the participants received an HRC stamp—a red exclamation mark—on a 1000-yen note as a passport. The name, date of birth, address, and belongings of each guest were verified, and fingerprints and body measurements were taken. Each participant was photographed from six points of view—face, left profile, right profile, back, top and bottom—to create a custom-sized model of a shelter that could be ordered in four sizes, ranging from life-size to one-tenth of life-size. They then had to be measured for their body volume by being immersed into a bathtub filled with water.

The group also prepared five Mystery Cans or as Akasegawa referred to them, "Universe Cans", which were tin cans marked with the group's signature red “!” insignia and filled with unknown contents. Jōnouchi Motoharu’s film Shelter Plan which documented the even shows that Nakanishi had papered the walls of the suite with images from the General Catalogue of Males ’63.

Scholars such as Jessica Santone have read the work as "a critique of Cold War bureaucratic state machines by mimicking their excessive documentation and surveillant control of bodies, while drawing attention to the specificities of the individuals as they differ from normative ideals." Taro Nettleton makes a connection between this event and Cleaning Event, stating that the surveillance of bodies by the government was intended to present a veneer of a physically fit populace.

The English Fluxus version of the work was mistranslated as Human Box Event by Shigeko Kubota, eventually title Hotel Event, and was characterised without the specific Japanese socio-political context.

=== The Great Panorama Exhibition (aka Closing Event) (May 12–16, 1964) ===
The Great Panorama Exhibition ran from May 12–16 at the Naiqua Gallery in Tokyo. A questioning of the exhibition format, the group presented an exhibition that was only ever closed and not visible to its audience. They placed an announcement on the door that the space was closed “by the hands of Hi Red Center. When you have free time, please make sure not to visit it." The group made sure to include both Japanese and English renditions of the announcement, conscious of foreigners who might want to enter the gallery.

A diagram of the space was produced to indicate the parameters of the exhibition space, namely the closed door. The work was structured by its "opening" and "closing events, which in fact were the inverse, with the sealing of the door at the opening and its unsealing at its closing.

At the opening event, the group used hammers and nails to affix the door, with no spectators except for a cockroach trapped in a glass, who was left in sealed gallery space. The closing event was officiated by Jasper Johns, who pulled out the first nail of the sealed gallery door. This closing event had a sizeable audience, including art critic Takiguchi Shūzō and artists Yoko Ono and Sam Francis. Drinks were served. By subverting the functions and performativity of exhibition openings and closings, the collective wanted to position the space exterior to the gallery space as the work or panorama on display, rather than what is contained within the gallery space. No longer was the artwork form in question—the exhibition format needed to be challenged as well.

Naiqua Gallery was an alternative gallery space adjacent to institutional spaces, existing within a broader system of commercial versus rental galleries which were further distinguished by the curatorial direction and rental paid by the artist. Thus, the space is further encoded with the notion that not even this alternative space can contain or host the kind of Art worth exhibiting, providing a deeper impetus to seek Art in the streets.

=== Dropping Event (October 10, 1964) ===
In Dropping Event (October 10, 1964), the group heaved a suitcase and its contents off the building of the Ikenobō Flower-Arranging School’s headquarters (Ikenobō Kaikan). After dropping the objects they collected and packed them all into the battered suitcase, placing it in a public locker and sending the key to the locker to someone chosen at random from a phone book. Dropping Event was documented by photographers Minoru Hirata and Hanaga Mitsutoshi.

=== Cleaning Event (aka Be Clean! aka Campaign to Promote Cleanliness and Order in the Metropolitan Area) (October 16, 1964) ===
The group is most known for this performance work, which took place on the bustling district of Ginza in Tokyo on Saturday, October 16, 1964. It was intentionally staged during the duration of the 1964 Tokyo Olympic Games, as a criticism of how the Japanese government had hastily beautified and modernised Tokyo to present the city as economically advanced post-World War II. More incisively, these cleaning efforts were specifically targeted against unwanted citizens such as the homeless and ‘thought perverts" (shisōteki henshitsusha).

The group started cleaning the streets in Ginza with inefficient tools, such as cotton balls with ammonia, dental tools, surgeons sponges, tooth picks, linen napkins or toothbrushes, polishing any metal pieces they could find on the pavement—parodying or emphasising the futility of such cleaning efforts. They also carried billboard signs with "Be Clean!" in English and "Soji-chu" (Cleaning now) in Japanese. The three core members and their associates were dressed in outfits used by laboratory technicians during the Olympic Games, paired with an incongruous pair of shades and a red armband with the group’s trademark “!” in white. Despite this deliberate self-identification, passersby did not question their clearly heightened act of cleaning—proving the legitimacy of the group's critique of how extreme or performative prior government cleaning initiatives had been.

Leading up to the happening event itself, the group also prepared flyers as an additional parody of bureaucratic organisation. The flyer posed an open call for participation, detailing arbitrary heuristic information under the organisation of the fictional “Metropolitan Environment Hygiene Execution Committee”. The flyer included a list of fictional and actual co-organisers and sponsors, such as the Tokyo’s Olympics Organizing Committee, Fluxus Japanese Section and Group Ongaku, reflecting the collective conception of the work, without full attribution to the group itself. This event was also submitted to Yasunao Tone's "Tone Prize exhibition" (held at Naiqua Gallery in the same month), which critiqued the jury system of salons and competitive exhibitions.

Cleaning Event prefigures later "intercollective networking", being adopted by Kyukyoko Hyogen Kenkyujo (Final Art Institute) in 1973 and in the Expo '70 Destruction Joint-Struggle Group (Banpaku Hakai Kyõtõ-ha) protests in 1969-1970. The Expo '70 protests were directly informed by Cleaning Event, the collective participants being against Japan's rapid urbanisation under the auspices of presenting an illusion of "Progress and Harmony" (Expo '70's theme) at an international event. Both events were documented by photographers Hirata Minoru and Hanaga Mitsutoshi.

Through the group's affiliation to Fluxus, Cleaning Event has been staged out of Japan, though without reference of consideration of the original event's immediate socio-political context. An American edition of the event was organised by George Maciunas in New York City in 1965 (alongside Shelter Plan) and at the 1966 Fluxfest (performed by the students of Roberts Watts and Geoffery Hendricks at the Grand Army Plaza). It is said that Maciunas had a deep respect for the group's work.

== Documentation ==
Photographic documentation of the group's ephemeral activities was crucial for the works to be studied and historicised. Operating during the 1960s, there was rarely any form of filmic of video documentation of artistic activity in Japan,Shelter Plan being a rare exception that was documented by film. Most of the group's works was photographed by Hirata Minoru and Hanaga Mitsutoshi. Hirata described his documentation practice as capturing "Art that jumped outside [the box]" (Tobidashita āto), which also bears the connotations of art existing outside of the institutional site of exhibitions in Japan. Similarly, Nakanishi has described Yamanote Line Incident to be a invocation to break out of the box, by stubbornly repeating events that did not belong to the structure (kozosei) of this container (utsuwa), supplementing events that daily gush forth.

Jōnouchi’s film Shelter Plan exists as a form of documentation of the event itself, but includes images of other events. In the film, we see Yoko Ono signing a contract and lying on a bed, a still shot of Nakanishi's clothespin performance, the name card of the Hi Red Center group and the Imperial Hotel contract/rental form, Mystery Cans and a man taking a bath. It obfuscates the human body and figure, showing segments of the torso, back, head and toes in various orientations, intercutting as if to trace the process of measurement integral to the piece. This assemblage of fragments from the events question the indexicality of the film document, and its status as capturing the "live" happening. It is also crucial to note that this film work was not conceptualised by Hi-Red Center as an official form of documentation, yet nonetheless provides a document to be studied. Akasegawa himself believed that a document of a performance manifests its power. However, for works such as Yamanote Line Incident, scholars have argued that the group had staged the event with photographic documentation in mind, Daria Melnikova claiming that the event was staged for the camera itself. They go as far as to assert that "[the group used] documentation as an essential part of performance production, and with an even more radical stance of valuing the image more than the live action."

== Afterlife ==
Although Hi-Red Center never officially disbanded, the Cleaning Event happening proved to be their final artistic act. Akasegawa would later cryptically remark that “after Cleaning Event there was simply nothing left to do.” In fact, around that time Akasegawa was becoming increasingly preoccupied with his own trial for alleged counterfeiting of 1,000-yen notes, and thus did not have time for further events and happenings with Hi-Red Center.

As part of Akasegawa's trial, the members of the group restaged a few of their works (Takamatsu's String and presenting relics of the Shelter Plan event) in court in October 1966. Their demonstrations were intended to enlighten the court on the "happenings" nature of Akesagawa's work, yet inevitably substantiated their defense by arguing that the objects used in their performance events ought to be treated with museum-like care, contradicting the principles of their practice.

Akesagawa was found guilty, and appealed the verdict to the High and Supreme Courts (in 1970) to no avail.

=== Exhibitions ===
There have been a few solo retrospectives dedicated to the activities of Hi-Red Centre, all mainly situated within gallery spaces.

- 2013, February 6–March 27. "Hi Red Center", Centre of Contemporary Art (CCA) Glasgow, Scotland.
- 2013-14. “Hi-Red Center: The Documents of “Direct Action””. Dedicated to the 50th Anniversary of the group.
  - 2013, November 9–December 23. Nagoya City Art Museum, Nagoya, Japan.
  - 2014, February 11th–March 23. Shoto Museum of Art, Shibuya, Japan.
- 2018, 28 September–28 October. "Jiro Takumatsu 高松次郎 | Hi Red Center | Hirata Minoru 平田実 | Kim Ku Lim 김구림" curated by Victor Wang, 111 Great Titchfield St, London, England.

The group has also been featured in the following seminal post-war Japanese art blockbuster exhibitions.

- 1994-95. “Japanese Art After 1945: Scream Against the Sky” curated by Alexandra Munroe.
  - 1994, February 5–March 30. Yokohama Museum of Art, Yokohama, Japan.
  - 1995, September 14, 1994–January 8, 1995. Guggenheim Museum SoHo, New York City, United States of America.
  - 1995, May 31–August 27. San Francisco Museum of Modern Art and Yerba Buena Center for the Arts, San Francisco, United States of America.
- 2012-13, Nov 18, 2012–Feb 25, 2013. "Tokyo 1955–1970: A New Avant-Garde” curated by Doryun Chong, The Museum of Modern Art, New York City, United States of America.

Their work has also been shown in the following group shows.

- 1999, April 28–August 29. "Global Conceptualism: Points of Origin, 1950s -1980s", curatorial team led by Jane Farver, Luis Camnitzer and Rachel Weiss, Queens Museum, Queens, United States of America.
- 2013-14, 22 November 2013–9 February 2014. "Great Crescent: Art and Agitation in the 1960s—Japan, South Korea, and Taiwan", curated by Cosmin Costinas, Lesley Ma and Doryun Chong, Para Site, Hong Kong.
