= Reiko Tomii =

Reiko Tomii (富井 玲子, Tomii Reiko) is a Japanese-born art historian and curator based in New York. Specializing in Japanese modern and conceptual art in its global context during the postwar period, Tomii is one of the leading art historians publishing in the English language on postwar Japanese art. Tomii helped organize the first North American retrospective on the work of Yayoi Kusama (1989), and collaborated closely with curator Alexandra Munroe to produce the seminal exhibition and book Japanese Art after 1945: Scream Against the Sky (1994). In 2017, Tomii's book Radicalism in the Wilderness: International Contemporaneity and 1960s Art in Japan was awarded the Robert Motherwell Book Award by the Dedalus Foundation. Tomii is also co-founder and co-director of the postwar Japanese art research collective PoNJA-GenKon (Post-1945 Japanese Art Discussion Group-Gendai Bijutsu Kondankai).

== Early life and education ==
Reiko Tomii was born and raised in Osaka, Japan. Raised by two pharmacist parents who pushed her to study math, Tomii received a B.S. degree in Math from Osaka University in 1979. Dissatisfied with this career path, she retook her junior and senior years and earned a second B.A. degree in Art History from the same university in 1982, followed by an M.A. degree in Art History in 1984. In 1988, she received her PhD in Art History from the University of Texas at Austin, working under the supervision of John R. Clarke and writing a dissertation on kinetic sculptor George Rickey entitled Between Two Continents: George Rickey, Kinetic Art and Constructivism, 1949-1968.

== Career ==
=== Curation ===
In 1988, Tomii took a job as Head of Research at the now-defunct Center for International Contemporary Arts (CICA) in New York City, where she worked with curator Alexandra Munroe to help curate the first retrospective exhibition in the United States on the works of Yayoi Kusama. Munroe has extensively praised Tomii's work on the exhibition, writing, "The biographical and bibliographic research compiled and translated by Reiko Tomii have created the foundation for all subsequent research on Kusama..." The two curators continued their collaboration by developing the seminal 1994 exhibition Scream Against the Sky: Japanese Art after 1945 at the Guggenheim SoHo in New York. Tomii would later go on to curate or co-curate numerous exhibitions on postwar art, including, among others, Global Conceptualism (Queens Museum of Art, 1999), Century City (Tate Modern, 2001), Art, Anti-Art, Non-Art (Getty Center, 2007), and Radicalism in the Wilderness: Japanese Artists in the Global 1960s (Japan Society, 2019).

=== Art historical research ===
Tomii has published articles on postwar Japanese art in peer-reviewed scholarly journals, as well as contributing to exhibition catalogs. Tomii is especially known for her work on Japanese artists and art collectives in the 1960s and 1970s such as Genpei Akasegawa, Hi-Red Center, Kazuo Shiraga, Gutai, and Mono-ha. In 2017, she published a single-authored scholarly monograph, Radicalism in the Wilderness: International Contemporaneity and 1960s Art in Japan (The MIT Press, 2016), which used archival research to examine the work of three Japanese artists/collectives, GUN, the Play, and Yutaka Matsuzawa, and show how their work intersected with that of international conceptual artists such as Stanley Brouwn and Yves Klein. Tomii's book was awarded the prestigious Robert Motherwell Book Award, which came with a $10,000 cash prize. The prize selection committee praised the book as "impeccably researched and clearly written...offering a wealth of new insight and analysis on modernist art history of Japan in the 1960s and 1970s...thereby expanding and challenging the understanding of global modernisms."

=== PoNJA-GenKon ===
Tomii founded the postwar Japanese art research collective PoNJA-GenKon (Post-1945 Japanese Art Discussion Group-Gendai Bijutsu Kondankai) along with fellow art historian Miwako Tezuka in March 2003. Since that time, the organization has grown to become an international network with more than 200 art history researchers as members. Among other activities, PoNJA-GenKon has organized eight international conferences and symposia, co-hosted by Yale University (2005), The Getty Center and UCLA (2007), the Guggenheim Museum (2009), the University of Michigan (2010), the Asia Society, New York (2010), the University of Southern California (2012), the Museum of Modern Art New York University, and the Japan Society (2014), and the University of Chicago (2017).

=== Other work ===
In 2013, Tomii appeared in the documentary film Cutie and the Boxer, about Japanese avant-garde artist Ushio Shinohara and his wife Noriko.

== Exhibitions curated or co-curated ==
- Global Conceptualism: Points of Origin, 1950s–1980s (Queens Museum of Art, 1999)
- Century City: Tokyo 1967–73 (Tate Modern, 2001)
- Noriyuki Yanagi・Naoyoshi Hikosaka Two Person Exhibition (Whitebox, New York, 2001)
- Resounding Spirit: Japanese Contemporary Art of the 1960s (Gibson Gallery, 2005)
- Art, Anti-Art, Non-Art (Getty Center, 2007)
- Kazuo Shiraga: Six Decades (Fergus McCaffrey Gallery, 2009)
- Views of Life (hpgrp Gallery, New York, 2012)
- Radicalism in the Wilderness: Japanese Artists in the Global 1960s (Japan Society, 2019)
- Yutaka Matsuzawa: Towards Quantum Art (John Young Museum of Art, 2020)

== Selected publications ==
In a statistical overview derived from writings by and about Reiko Tomii, OCLC/WorldCat encompasses roughly 90 works in 172 publications in 1 languages and 2,039 library holdings.

=== Books ===
- Tomii, Reiko (2016). Radicalism in the Wilderness: International Contemporaneity and 1960s Art in Japan. The MIT Press. ISBN 978-0262034128.

=== Book chapters ===
- Tomii, Reiko (2007). "After the 'Descent to the Everyday': Japanese Collectivism from Hi Red Center to The Play, 1964-1973". In Stimson, Blake; Sholette, Gregory (eds.). Collectivism After Modernism. University of Minnesota Press. pp. 44–75. ISBN 978-0816644629.

=== Scholarly articles ===
- Tomii, Reiko (2002). "State v. (Anti-)Art: Model 1,000 Yen Note Incident by Akasegawa Genpei and Company". Positions: East Asia Cultures Critique. 10 (1): 141–172. doi:10.1215/10679847-10-1-141. S2CID 144997715.
- Tomii, Reiko (2004). "Historicizing 'Contemporary Art': Some Discursive Practices in Gendai Bijutsu in Japan". Positions: East Asia Cultures Critique. 12 (3): 611–641. doi:10.1215/10679847-12-3-611. S2CID 144224880.
- Tomii, Reiko (2009). "'International Contemporaneity' in the 1960s: Discoursing on Art in Japan and Beyond". Japan Review (21): 123–147.
- Tomii, Reiko (2013). "Six Contradictions of Mono-Ha". Review of Japanese Culture and Society. 25 (25): 214–222. doi:10.1353/roj.2013.0013. S2CID 170745914.
- Tomii, Reiko (2019). "'A Test Tube' of New Art: Naiqua and the Rental Gallery System in 1960s Japan". Afterall Journal. 47 (1): 146–161.

=== Articles in exhibition catalogs ===
- Tomii, Reiko (1999). "Concerning the Institution of Art: Conceptualism in Japan". In Mariani, Philomena (ed.). Global Conceptualism: Points of Origin, 1950s–1980s. Queens Museum of Art. pp. 14–29. ISBN 0-960-45149-8.
- Tomii, Reiko (2007). "Geijutsu on Their Minds: Memorable Words on Anti-Art". In Merewether, Charles (ed.). Art, Anti-Art, Non-Art: Experimentations in the Public Sphere in Postwar Japan, 1950–1970. Getty Research Institute. pp. 35–58. ISBN 978-0892368662.
- Tomii, Reiko (2009). "Shiraga Paints: Toward a 'Concrete' Discussion". In Tomii, Reiko; McCaffrey, Fergus (eds.). Kazuo Shiraga: Six Decades. McCaffrey Fine Art. pp. 9–30. ISBN 978-0979048449.
- Tomii, Reiko (2013). "An Experiment in Collectivism: Gutai's Prewar Origin and Postwar Evolution". In Tiampo, Ming; Munroe, Alexandra (eds.). Gutai: Splendid Playground. Guggenheim Museum. pp. 248–253. ISBN 978-0892074891.
