= Robert Motherwell Book Award =

Awards for books on history and criticism of modernism in the arts

The Robert Motherwell Book Award is an award granted annually by the Dedalus Foundation to the author of an outstanding book first published the year before in the history and criticism of modernism in the arts, including the visual arts, literature, music, and the performing arts. The award is named in honor of the founder of the Dedalus Foundation, American abstract expressionist painter Robert Motherwell, and comes with a $10,000 cash prize. Nominations are forwarded to the foundation by book publishers, and the winner is chosen by a panel of distinguished scholars and writers.

== List of honorees ==
- 2002 — Daniel Arasse, Anselm Kiefer
- 2003 — Gerard Durozoi, History of the Surrealist Movement
- 2004 — Roger Benjamin, Orientalist Aesthetics: Art, Colonialism, and French North Africa, 1880-1930
- 2005 — Theodore Ziolkowski, Ovid and the Moderns
- 2006 — Lawrence Rainey, Revisiting "The Waste Land"
- 2007 — Jane Ashton Sharp, Russian Modernism between East and West: Natal'ia Goncharova and the Moscow Avant-Garde
- 2008 — Aleksandra Shatskikh, Vitebsk: The Life of Art
- 2009 — R. Bruce Elder, Harmony and Dissent: Film and Avant-Garde Art Movements in the Early Twentieth Century
- 2010 — Susan Sidlauskas, Cézanne's Other: The Portraits of Hortense
- 2011 — Matthew Jesse Jackson, The Experimental Group: Ilya Kabakov, Moscow Conceptualism, Soviet Avant-Gardes
- 2012 — Anna Sigridur Arnar, The Book as Instrument: Stephane Mallarme, the Artist's Book, and the Transformation of Print Culture
- 2013 — Jennifer Jane Marshall, Machine Art, 1934
- 2014 — Michael North, Novelty: A History of the New
- 2015 — Megan R. Luke, Kurt Schwitters: Space, Image, Exile
- 2016 — Annie Bourneuf, Paul Klee: The Visible and the Legible
- 2017 — Reiko Tomii, Radicalism in the Wilderness: International Contemporaneity and 1960s Art in Japan
- 2018 — Julia Bryan-Wilson, Fray: Art and Textile Politics
- 2019 — Fabiola López-Durán, Eugenics in the Garden: Transatlantic Architecture in the Crafting of Modernity.
- 2020 — Suzanne Blier, Picasso’s Demoiselles: The Untold Origins of a Modern Masterpiece
- 2021 — David Joselit, Heritage and Debt: Art in Globalization
- 2022 — Francesca Esmay, Ted Mann, and Jeffrey Weiss, Object Lessons: Case Studies in Minimal Art—The Guggenheim Panza Collection Initiative
- 2023 — David J. Getsy, Queer Behavior: Scott Burton and Performance Art
- 2024 — Joan Kee, The Geometries of Afro Asia: Art Beyond Solidarity
- 2025 — Ara H. Merjian, Fragments of Totality: Futurism, Fascism, and the Sculptural Avant-Garde
