= Group Ongaku =

Japanese noise music collective

- Origin: Tokyo, Japan
- Genres: Noise, experimental, free improvisation, avant-garde
- Years active: 1958–1962
- Labels: HEAR Sound Art Library, SEER Sound Archive
- Past members: Takehisa Kosugi; Yasunao Tone; Shukou Mizuno; Mieko Shiomi "Chieko"; Mikio Tojima; Yumiko Tanno; Genichi Tsuge

Group Ongaku (グループ音楽, Gurūpu Ongaku) was a Japanese noise music and sound art collective exploring musical improvisation, comprising six composers, including Takehisa Kosugi, Mieko Shiomi (Chieko Shiomi), and Yasunao Tone. Ongaku in their group name means "music." The group began their activities in Tokyo in 1958, mainly as a students group at the Tokyo National University of Fine Arts and Music. In 1960, they formalized the group by naming it Group Ongaku and continued until 1962. Their music freely crossed from orchestral to ethnic instruments, technology, and daily objects, melting sound production from devices associated with vastly different forms of sonic practices. In addition, they strategized to expand the musical experience in an attempt to merge the act of composition and that of performance. They shifted their focus from just creating sounds to deploying actions as music. From 1961 onwards, they came into contact with Fluxus coordinator George Maciunas and some members (including Tone, Kosugi, and Shiomi) became affiliated with Fluxus. The Japanese Fluxus contingency, centering on them, expanded and Tone called this loose collection of people "Tokyo Fluxus."

== Historic background ==
In 1957, Yochirō Irino, the father of dodecaphonic music in Japan, founded the Nijusseiki Ongaku Kenkyūjo ("20th-Century Music Study Center"), together with the composers Toshirō Mayuzumi and Makoto Moroi and the music critic Hidekazu Yoshida. Later, Tōru Takemitsu and Toshi Ichiyanagi joined the original group. A study center was created in Japan and became a gathering place for the main experimental composers. Once a year a festival of contemporary music was organized, with concerts and conferences (devoted to Japanese and foreign compositions) in the city of Karuizawa. Five festivals were organized from 1957 to 1962. In 1961, Ichiyanagi arrived in Osaka, following his stay in John Cage's class. He introduced the experimental works of young foreign composers and above all he performed Cage's indeterminate music. The trend of musical chance operation takes over and the group stops its activities. In Japan, these years were known as the Cage/Ichiyanagi shock.

In 1958, from this study group, a collection of young avant-garde practitioners emerged; they included Takeshisa Kosugi, Mieko Shiomi (Chieko Shiomi), Yasunao Tone, Yumiko Tanno, Mikio Tojima and Shūkō Mizuno. Most of them were musicology students at Tokyo National University of Fine Arts and Music. Their experiments were encouraged and facilitated by the young ethnomusicologist Koizumi Fumio, who gave the performers the run of the ethnomusicology studio and its collections of instruments. On 8 May 1960, the six composers founded a group called Group Ongaku.

== Members ==
- Takeshisa Kosugi
- Mieko Shiomi (Chieko Shiomi)
- Yasunao Tone
- Yumiko Tanno
- Mikio Tojima
- Shuko Mizuno

== Artistic stance ==
Group Ongaku is regarded as the first improvisational music and sound collective in Japan. Group Ongaku's aim was to re-evaluate improvisational elements in music, which had been lost in Western music since the Baroque era; its members sought to rediscover the meaning of music, which they thought had been minimized. The group members focused on the simultaneous creation and performance of sounds in real time, often incorporating chance actions and spontaneous responses to musical and nonmusical events in creating their "anti-music". Their music freely crossed from orchestral to ethnic instruments, technology, and daily objects, melting sound production from devices associated with vastly different forms of sonic practices.

The group's activities began with collective improvisation, which led to the objets- and instruction-based sound art, although they also produced a few body-based performances. On this topic, Shiomi recalled the early days of the group's activities: "This explosion of activity was characteristic of our insatiable desire for new sound materials and new definitions (redefinition) of music itself. Every week we discovered some new technique [or] method for playing a previously unthought-of ‘objet sonor,’ and argued endlessly about how to extend its use, and what relationships of sound structure could be created between each performer. We experimented with the various components of every instrument we could think of, like using the inner action and frame of the piano, or using vocal and breathing sounds, creating sounds from the (usually unplayable) wooden parts of instruments, and every conceivable device of bowing and pizzicato on stringed instruments. At times we even turned our hands to making music with ordinary objects like tables and chairs, ash trays and bunch of keys."

== Name ==
The group name was proposed by Yasunao Tone, who had shifted from the study of literature to music, with a strong interest in Surrealism (notably on the creative principle of automatism). His proposal Group Ongaku was inspired by Littérature (literature), a magazine founded in 1919 by Louis Aragon, Philippe Soupault and André Breton. The name Group Ongaku asserted the same combination of antiphrasis and urgent supplantation, humiliation, and liberation with which Breton, Aragon and Soupault titled their magazine. For Tone, asserting the deeply analogical relationship between Group Ongaku and the formative years of Surrealism did not mean a simple repetition of this historical gesture. With Group Ongaku, Tone and his compatriots would free not words (Littérature), however, but sounds and things.

Tone later abandoned the common practice of referring to the group as Group Ongaku, as the nontranslation of the Japanese word for "music", ongaku, obscures this central relationship to music as a whole while supporting a neonativist notion of linguistic cultural identity.

== Activities ==
Trained as musicologists at Tokyo National University of Fine Art and Music, they first performed improvisational music together in 1958 at various locations, including a lumberyard and a construction site.

=== Recordings (1960) ===
They gathered at the house of Mizuno on May 8, 1960, to tape-record two improvisational concerts, Automatism and Objet. They produced sounds with a piano, a pedal organ, a cello, and an alto saxophone, along with an electric vacuum cleaner, a radio, an oil drum, a doll, and a set of dishes, and one performer manipulated the recorder reel to vary the speed of the recording. With their emphasis on autonomy and concreteness as well as the use of the spatial dimension in creating acoustic sound, the recordings were a landmark event in the history of experimental music.

=== Concert of Improvisational Music and Acoustic Objet (1961) ===
The group's first public performance, Concert of Improvisational Music and Acoustic Objet, was held on September 15, 1961 at the Sōgetsu Art Center in Tokyo, which was a mecca of experimental music, performance, and film and animation programs throughout the 1960's. The group used a variety of "instruments" including everyday objects (vacuum cleaner, dishes, washboard...), in a methodology of improvisation described as automatism. They gave their concert in front of a full house (with a capacity of 400 people), which was covered by major newspapers such as Mainichi and Asahi. This performance precedes John Cage's visit to Japan (1962) and from then on is recognized as a pioneering work in experimental music, paving the way for the Fluxus experiments that will follow. Hence, the so-called Cage shock is not so much a historical fact as a journalistic phenomenon, as Tone observes.

=== Collaboration with Toshi Ichiyanagi (1962) ===
The following year, shortly after Group Ongaku made their debut at the Sōgetsu Art Center, members of the group were invited by the young composer Toshi Ichiyanagi, who had recently returned from New York, to join him in performing his music in the Sōgetsu Contemporary Series. The first concert of live electronic music in Japan, it included Ichiyanagi's Kaiki for Koto for John Cage (1960) and IBM:Happening and Music Concrete (1960); for the latter the performers were given a set of IBM punch cards, which they interpreted at will.

Another interest shared by the composer and Group Ongaku was the social and spatial dimension of music. Just as the group used spatial distance as an organizing principle in the composing of their pieces, focusing on the simultaneous creation and performance of sounds across time, so Ichiyanagi explored differences between where a sound originated and where it was heard (see Distance, 1962).

=== Dinner Commemorating Our Defeat in the War (August 15, 1962) ===
On the 17th anniversary of Japan's surrender in World War II, members from Neo Dada reunited along with Group Ongaku and Tatsumi Hijikata to stage a collaborative performance, entitled Dinner Commemorating Our Defeat in the War (敗戦記念晩餐会), in a Tokyo suburb with the help of art critic Yoshida Yoshie. The event consisted of the performers eating a sumptuous dinner eaten before an audience, whose members had unwittingly purchased a 200-yen ticket for the privilege of watching them. The night was subtitled "Art minus Art" (Geijutsu mainasu geijutsu). During the evening, several performances followed one another: Masunobu Yoshimura brushed his teeth for about 30 minutes, Shō Kazakura stood on a chair and pressed a hot iron to his chest as part of a "ritual to execute the will of the Marquis de Sade," Yasunao Tone and Group Ongaku gave a concert of experimental music, and Tatsumi Hijikata stripped naked and performed Butoh, among others.

== Recording ==
Group Ongaku. Music of Group Ongaku. Osaka: HEAR Sound Art Library, 1996, compact-disc.

1	Automatism Performers – Chieko Shiomi*, Mikio Tojima, Shukou Mizuno, Takehisa Kosugi, Yasunao Tone, Yumiko Tanno	26:20
2	Object Performers – Chieko Shiomi*, Mikio Tojima, Shukou Mizuno, Takehisa Kosugi, Yasunao Tone, Yumiko Tanno	7:34
	Metaplasm 9-15	25:49
3a	Part 1 Cello – Mikio Tojima Cello, Drums, Tape – Shukou Mizuno Guitar – Genichi Tsuge Piano – Chieko Shiomi* Saxophone, Tape – Yasunao Tone Violin, Saxophone, Tape – Takehisa Kosugi	14:16
3b	Part 2 Cello – Mikio Tojima Cello, Drums, Tape – Shukou Mizuno Guitar – Genichi Tsuge Piano – Chieko Shiomi* Saxophone, Tape – Yasunao Tone Violin, Saxophone, Tape – Takehisa Kosugi	11:26

Tracks 1 and 2 recorded on May 8, 1960, at Mizuno's house.

Track 3 recorded on September 15, 1961, at Sogetsu Kaikan Hall, Tokyo.
