= Takehisa Kosugi =

Japanese composer, violinist and artist

- 小杉 武久
- Born: March 24, 1938; Tokyo, Japan
- Died: October 12, 2018 (aged 80); Ashiya, Hyōgo, Japan
- Occupations: Composer, violinist

Takehisa Kosugi (小杉 武久, Kosugi Takehisa; March 24, 1938 – October 12, 2018) was a Japanese composer, violinist and artist associated with the Fluxus movement.

== Early life ==
Kosugi was born in Tokyo in 1938, and studied musicology at the Tokyo University of the Arts, graduating in 1962.

=== Early musical influences ===
Kosugi first became drawn to music listening to his father play harmonica and listening to violin recordings of Mischa Elman and Joseph Szigeti while as a child in post-war Japan. His later influences as a university student included the 1950s musical experimentation occurring in Europe and the US.

He was also influenced by jazz, citing Charlie Parker’s "spontaneity and freedom." Simultaneously, traditional Japanese music and Noh theater informed his music education, particularly the concept in Noh of "ma" which denotes the empty spaces between sounds. In 1963, he assisted on the soundtrack for the Japanese animation television show Tetsuwan Atomu, or, Astro Boy.

== Musical career ==
=== Group Ongaku ===
He started Tokyo-based seven-member ensemble Group Ongaku with his first improvisation partner Shuku Mizuno, which was active from 1958 to 1962. The group explored the limits of music by using the noises of ordinary objects and eschewing conscientiousness of the other members’ sound. Their first concert was the "Concert of Improvisational Music and Sound Object" at the Sōgetsu Art Center on September 15, 1961. His 1960s career with Group Ongaku is extensively covered in the 32-page essay "Experimental Japan," which appears in the book Japrocksampler (Bloomsbury, 2007), written by author/musician/occultist Julian Cope.

While in Japan Kosugi also worked with butoh dance originator Tatsumi Hijikata and the radical Japanese artist group Hi-Red Center. Along with Natsuyuki Nakanishi and Jiro Takamatsu of Hi-Red Center and the sculptor Hiroshi Kobatake, Kosugi participated in "Kuroku fuchidorareta bars no nureta kushami" (Wet Sneeze of a Black-lined Rose), a 1962 theater even organized by the radical leftist group Hanzaisha Domei (League of Criminals). Kosugi also performed in the Yomiyuri Independent Exhibition in 1962 and 1963, its final iteration.

=== Fluxus ===
Kosugi is probably best known for the experimental music that he created from 1960 until 1975. Kosugi's primary instrument was the violin, which he sent through various echo chambers and effects to create a bizarre, jolting music quite at odds with the drones of other more well-known Fluxus affiliated artists, such as Tony Conrad, John Cale, and Henry Flynt.

Kosugi's involvement with the Fluxus artists began through the introduction of the composer Toshi Ichiyanagi. Ichiyanagi, who had studied in New York with Fluxus progenitor John Cage, had noticed the performance of Group Ongaku at their 1961 Sōgetsu Art Center performance and subsequently invited them to perform with him at the same venue two months later. Ichiyanagi subsequently introduced the group to the "event scores" of George Brecht and sent recordings of Kosugi and his peers to George Maciunas, the founder of the Fluxus group. Maciunas began to sell the "complete works of Kosugi" for two dollars in 1963 and would go on to include him in many more Fluxus editions.

Kosugi's involvement with Fluxus saw many score and event like works. The works, however, were not conceived of events and may not have been written down by the artist. In 1963, Kosugi composed for Fluxus 1 a musical piece called Theatre Music in the form of a rectangle of cardstock that bore the trace of a spiral of moving feet. This was paired with the instructions: "Keep walking intently". Other works from this period include "Anima 1" (1961, alternatively "event for long string"), which appears to have been performed by Alison Knowles and Ben Vautier in 1964 as the 359 Canal street loft that Maciunas had made the Fluxus headquarters. The work prompted the performer to "Roll up a long chord," in response to which Vautier wound string around a seated Knowles and entangled her with the audience. This contrasts with Kosugi's own performances of the piece in which he "wound string around his entire body." In 1965, he moved to New York City where he collaborated with Fluxus affiliates including Nam June Paik and Charlotte Moorman. One collaborative work was "Instrumental Music" in which Kosugi attempted to cut out the silhouette of Moorman projected onto a screen by a spotlight. This work, among others, were performed at the "Music Expanded" program devised by Kosugi, Moorman and Paik at Town Hall in Manhattan in 1967.

=== Later career ===
Moving back to Japan in 1967, Kosugi continued his experimentation in collectivist creativity. Prompted by the idea to "stay in Taj Mahal for 24 hours and return" as a kind of event score, in 1969 Kosugi formed another improvisational group, the Taj Mahal Travellers. This itinerant group travelled in a Volkswagen van from the Netherlands to India, stopping in the UK, Italy, Germany, Scandinavia and Iran staging outdoor performances and happenings. Their albums include July 15, 1971 (CBS/Sony) and 1-August, 1974 (Columbia Records). Cope's Japrocksampler features a detailed 12-page biography of the Taj Mahal Travellers, the music of which Cope describes as being "reminiscent of the creaking rigging of the un-manned Mary Celeste".

During the late 1970s and early 1980s, Kosugi had other means of facilitating improvisational experimentation with others as well. In addition to conducting a workshop during this time, Kosugi would bring his violin with him to cafes and bars in order to be prepared for any opportunity to improvise with strangers. During this time, Kosugi also developed his practice making innovative sound installations that anticipated the genre of "sound art."

After the Taj Mahal Travellers disbanded in 1975, Kosugi moved back to the United States and in 1977 he was invited to be a resident musician/composer along with David Tudor at the Merce Cunningham Dance Company. Here, he worked with John Cage and Merce Cunningham, both of whom he had worked with in 1964 when they first visited Japan. Beginning in 1995, Kosugi served as music director for the Merce Cunningham Dance Company, a position he held from 1995 to 2012 when the company closed. In 1999, Kosugi worked with Sonic Youth on their album SYR4: Goodbye 20th Century. Responding to Kosugi's death in 2018, Thurston Moore of Sonic Youth wrote on Twitter, "The times spent playing music with you will never fade. You are and were the real deal." Other notable musical collaborators include David Tudor, Peter Kowald, and saxophonist Steve Lacy.

Kosugi received grants from The JDR 3rd Fund in 1966 and 1977. He also received a DAAD fellowship grant to reside in West Berlin in 1981. In 1975, Kosugi released the solo album Catch-wave (CBS/Sony), which has been reissued multiple times on both CD and vinyl. Kosugi received a John Cage Award for Music from Foundation for Contemporary Performance Arts in 1994. Venues at which Kosugi has performed include Museum of Contemporary Art in Tokyo, Edinburgh International Festival, Royal Albert Hall, The Getty Center, Miami Subtropics Experimental Music and Sound Arts Festival, Kushiro Art Museum, Lincoln Center Festival, and Biennale d'Art Contemporaine de Lyon. Venues that have exhibited Kosugi's sound installations include Raven Row, Deutzer Brücke, the Mori Art Museum, the Venice Biennale, and the Aichi Prefectural Museum of Art. In 2015, the Whitney Museum of American Art opened a performance retrospective of Kosugi's work titled, "Takehisa Kosugi: Music Expanded" referencing the 1967 Town Hall event. The retrospective was curated by Jay Sanders. 2015 also saw the first major solo exhibition of Kosugi's work, titled "SPACINGS," at Ikon Gallery.

== Death ==
Kosugi died October 12, 2018, in Ashiya, Japan from esophageal cancer. At the time of his death, Kosugi was survived by his longtime partner and manager, Takako Okamoto, and three brothers.

== Works ==
- Anima 1 (1961)
- Micro 1 (1961)
- Organic Music (1962)
- Anima 2 (1962)
- Chironomy 1 (1962)
- Ear Drum Event (1962)
- South No. 1 (1962)
- Theater Music (1963)
- Malika 5 (1963)
- To W (1964)
- South No. 2 (1964)
- Anima 7 (1964)
- South No. 3 (1965)
- Tender Music (1965)
- Film & Film No. 4 (1965)
- Instrumental Music (1965)
- Piano (1966)
- Music G (1966)
- Eclipse (1967)
- Catch-Wave (1967)
- South No. 5 (1971)
- Catch-Wave '71 (1971)
- Piano-Wave-Mix (1972)
- Heterodyne (1972)
- Wave Code #e-1 (1974)
- Numbers/Tones (1976)
- S. E. Wave/E. W. Song (1976)
- South No. 8 (1979)
- Interspersion (1979)
- Untitled Piece (1980)
- Interspection for 54 Sounds (1980)
- Cycles (1981)
- Cycles for 7 Sounds (1981)
- The Fly (1982)
- Walking (1983)
- Intersection (1983)
- Spacings (1984)
- Melodies (1984)
- Assemblage (1986)
- +- (1987)
- 75 Letters and Improvisation (1987)
- Rhapsody (1987)
- Loops No. 1, No. 2 (1988)
- Spectra (1989)
- Violin Improvisations CD (1989)
- Module (1990)
- Parabola (w/ Fast Forward) (1990)
- Streams (1991)
- Modulation (1991)
- Islands (1991)
- Reflections (1992)
- Metal Interspersion (1992)
- Transfigurations (1993)
- Streams (1993)
- Zoom (1993)
- Streams No. 2 (1994)
- Imitated Summer (1996)
- Illuminated Summer (1996)
- Tetrafeed (1997)
- Wave Code A-Z (1997)

== Festival performances ==
- Festival d'Automne (Paris, 1978, 1979)
- The Festival at La Sainte-Baume (1978, 1979, 1980)
- The Holland Festival (1979)
- Opening Concert (Rome, 1980)
- Workshop Freie Musik (Berlin, 1984)
- Pro Musica Nova (Bremen, 1984)
- Almeida International Festival of Contemporary Music (London, 1986)
- Welt Musik Tage `87 (Cologne, 1987)
- Experimentelle Musik (München, 1986, 1988)
- Inventionen (Berlin, 1986, 1989, 1992)
- Biennale d'art contemporain (Lyon, 1993)

== Sound installations ==
- Für Augen und Ohren (Berlin, 1980)
- Ecouter par les yeux (Paris, 1980)
- Soundings at Purchase (New York, 1981)
- New Music America Festival (Washington, 1983)
- Im Toten Winken (Hamburg, 1984)
- Klanginstallationen (Bremen, 1987)
- Kunst als Grenzbeschreitung: John Cage und die Moderne (München, 1991)
- Iventionen (Berlin, 1992)
- Musik Tage (Donaueschingen, 1993)
