= The Play (art collective) =

Japanese art collective

The Play is a Japanese art collective founded in 1967 and based in Kansai. In 2016, the National Museum of Art, Osaka dedicated a retrospective to their work.

== Bibliography ==
- Royer, Élodie; Gourmel, Yoann, eds. (2014). The Play: big book : 1967-2014 (in French). Toulouse: Les Presses du réel. ISBN 978-2-9540465-4-9. OCLC 905649868.
