= Jiro Takamatsu =

Japanese artist (1936–1998)

Jirō Takamatsu (高松 次郎, Takamatsu Jirō; 20 February 1936 – 25 June 1998) was one of the most important postwar Japanese artists. Takamatsu used photography, sculpture, painting, drawing, and performance to fundamentally investigate the philosophical and material conditions of art. Takamatsu's practice was dedicated to the critique of cognition and perception, through the rendering and variation of morphological devices, such as shadow, tautology, appropriation, perceptual and perspective distortion and representation. Takamatsu's conceptual work can be understood through his notions of the Zero Dimension, which renders an object or form to observe its fundamental geometrical components. Takamatsu isolated these smallest constituent elements, asserting that these elements produce reality, or existence. For Takamatsu the elementary particle represents “the ultimate of division” and also “emptiness itself,” like the a line within a painting—there appears to be nothing more beyond the line itself. Yet, Takamatsu's end goal was not to just prove the presence or object-ness of these elements, but rather to use them as a way to challenge and prove the limits of human perception, leading to his fixation on “absence” or the things that are unobservable.

The impact of Takamatsu's practice also has to be considered in terms of his contributions to the avant garde art scenes through his individual practice and work with collectives, as well as the legibility of his work in the discourse of conceptual art and thus the broader international art world.

== Biography ==
=== Early life and education ===
Takamatsu was born in Tokyo in 1936. From 1954 to 1958 he attended Tokyo University of the Arts, where he majored in oil painting and was a classmate of his future Hi-Red Center member Natsuyuki Nakanishi. As part of his coursework, Takamatsu studied the beginnings of pictorial modernities spanning Sesshū Tōyō to Paul Cézanne (as noted in his writings). Duncan Wooldridge has argued that Takamtsu's interest in both modern Western and Japanese art histories allows us to understand his work as a crucial meeting point between culturally coded conventions, as well as his later success as a Japanese artist at the forefront of the movement towards international contemporaneity.

=== Yomiuri Indépendant Exhibition (1958-1963) ===
After graduation, Takamatsu began showing paintings at the raucous and unjuried Yomiuri Indépendant Exhibition. Sponsored by the Yomiuri Shimbun newspaper between 1949 and 1963 and held at the Tokyo Metropolitan Art Museum, this annual exhibition was modeled after the French Salon des Artistes Indépendants. Takamatsu formed his network of anti-establishment artists at the Yomiuri Indépendant, which became a site of exploration and experimentation for many avant-garde-minded younger artists, especially from 1958 onward.

From 1958 to 1961, Takamatsu submitted works to the painting section, but he re-conceived his practice as sculptural from 1961 to 1963. Takamatsu has attributed this shift to "sculptural" to the Point series of works he submitted in 1961, which consisted of masses of wire in varying states of being pulled from two dimensions to three dimensions. This evolved into the series String: Black, which Takamatsu showed at the 14th Yomiuri Indépendant in 1962, and which marked the beginning of a long series of artworks making use of string as an eminently portable medium which could be used to infiltrate and cordon off artistic space even beyond and outside the art gallery itself. One of these works was interactive, allowing viewers to don gloves and unravel a ball of black string along sheets of cloth.

Art critic Tōno Yoshiaki characterized artists participating in Yomiuri Indépendant as developing Anti-Art practices, departing from the conventional notion of art. Takamatsu and his peers became increasingly interested in moving beyond figural representation and into the mediation of performance and environments, causing the Tokyo Metropolitan Art Museum to institute rules banning obtrusive materials and installation arrangements for the 14th edition. Some artists continued their subversive strategy, leading to the suspension of the exhibition in January 1964. Thus, artists like Takamatsu relocated their practice from the exhibition space into the urban environments of Tokyo. This transition is best exemplified by Takamatsu's submissions to the final edition of the Yomiuri Indépendant in 1963, On the Anti-Existence of the Curtain (Kāten ni kansuru hanjitsuzaisei ni tsuite) and Cord (Himo), a single piece of black string against a white cloth background and a 1000 meter long string extending out of the museum space to the Ueno Station respectively.

=== Yamanote Line Incident (1962) ===
On October 18, 1962, Takamatsu along with future Hi-Red Center collaborator Natsuyuki Nakanishi and others, carried out an artistic happening they titled the "Yamanote Line Incident" (山手線事件, Yamanote-sen jiken), in which they boarded a Yamanote loop line train heading counter-clockwise on its route, disrupting the normalcy of passenger's commutes with a series of bizarre performative actions. Takamatsu served as the main photographer documenting the event.

On the Fluxus-produced map of Hi-Red Center's activities, compiled and edited with the help of Shigeko Kubota, the Yamanote Line Incident is listed as number three. This is despite the fact that the Yamanote Line Incident is now considered to belong more properly to the pre-history of Hi-Red Center. The work is printed as such:

“18 Oct. Event on Yamate loop line street car.

1. A continuous black string with various everyday objects attached to it at intervals was laid out on street from moving street car along its circular route.
2. Compact objects were hung from hand straps inside street car and observed by performers at close range with battery lights.
3. Faces of performers were painted white.
4. Performers read newspapers with holes burned in them.”

The event was featured in the magazine Keishō, then under the editorship of Yoshihiko Imaizumi. According to Akasegawa, Nakanishi and Takamatsu used the Yamanote Line as a site for their event in order to "destroy the hierarchical status of art by bringing it into the ‘space of daily activities.’”

=== Hi-Red Center (1963-1964) ===
In 1963, Takamatsu co-founded the art collective Hi-Red Center along with Natsuyuki Nakanishi and Genpei Akasegawa. This brief-lived but influential group executed a variety of performance art events that sought to eliminate the boundaries between daily life and art. The group's name was formed from the first kanji characters of the three artists' surnames: "high" (the "Taka" in Takamatsu), "red" (the "Aka" in Akasegawa), and "center" (the "Naka" in Nakanishi). The foundation for Hi-Red Center might be located in the roundtable discussion, sponsored by the art magazine Keishō in November 1962, on the relationship between art and political action (as reflected the recent Yamanote Line Incident happening) titled Signs of Discourse on Direct Action, in which all three members had participated. All three artists had begun as painters but had turned to methods of “direct action” through Hi-Red Center, a term taken from prewar socialist agitators. With “direct action,” the artists meant to raise to consciousness the absurdities and contradictions of Japanese society. This interest in Art as direct action has been contextualised as rooted in the atmosphere following massive Anpo protests against the U.S.-Japan Security Treaty in 1960.

Although the group's inaugural exhibition, Fifth Mixer Plan (Dai goji mikisā keikaku, May 1963), featured artworks the three artists had created independently, such as Takamatsu's busy entanglements of strings, Akasegawa's objects wrapped in printed 1000-yen notes, and Nakanishi's Konpakuto obuje ("Compact Objets"), egg-shaped translucent resign sculptures that embalmed everyday items, the emphasis on collaborative "direct action" came to the fore in the group's later activities, which featured a variety of "events," "plans," and "happenings." For example in Dropping Event (October 10, 1964), the group heaved various objects from the roof of Ikenobo Kaikan hall. After dropping the objects they collected and packed them all into a suitcase, placing it in a public locker and sending the key to the locker to someone chosen at random from a phone book. For Shelter Plan (1964), they booked a room at the Imperial Hotel and invited guests to have themselves custom-fitted for a personal nuclear fallout shelter. Participants included Yoko Ono and Nam June Paik, and were photographed from six sides to create a quasi-medical document ostensibly meant for the outfitting of personal fallout shelters. The group carried out its final happening, The Movement for the Promotion for a Clean and Organized Metropolitan Area (abbreviated as Cleaning Event) on October 16, 1964. The artists and their assistants dressed in goggles and lab coats, roped off small areas of public sidewalk and meticulously cleaned them to mock the efforts to beautify the streets ahead of the 1964 Tokyo Olympics.

The events and happenings were subjected to documentation by both collaborators and strangers; Takamatsu in particular hoped that outsider [gaibusha] who had no knowledge of their existence or intention would document these events, in order to confirm the multiplicity (fukusūsei) or externalization (kyakutaika) of their works. Although Hi-Red Center succeeded in attracting media attention and has come to be considered highly influential on later Japanese artists, its activities were short-lived; the group would dissolve only a year and a half after its inception, with Akasegawa recounting cryptically that “after Cleaning Event there was simply nothing left to do.”

=== Return to painting ===
In 1964, Takamatsu began his signature Shadows (影, kage) series of paintings (which he continued until the end of his life). With Shadows, Takamatsu launched a critical inquiry into the nature of painting by realistically painting images of people's shadows cast on white walls, uneven surfaces, or wooden planks to create a trompe l’oeil effect. This series of works recalls Plato's "Allegory of the Cave" as well as Pliny the Elder's account of the origins of painting, in which the daughter of the famed Greek potter Dibutades creates the first painting by tracing the silhouette of her lover.

=== Institutional recognition ===
When Takamatsu was around 30 years old (1966), he received a number of prizes including the Shell Art Award and the Nagaoka Museum of Contemporary Art Award. He was also awarded the Grand International Prize at the Tokyo Print Biennial (1972).

Takamatsu also held his first solo exhibition in 1966 at Tokyo Gallery, entitled Identification. It featured the early works in his Shadows series.

During this period of his career, Takamatsu, along with other Japanese artists like Nakahira Takuma, Enokura Koji, and Terayama Shuji, were actively interested in literature from Europe. Namely, they studied J.M.G. Le Clézio's novels, Takamatsu designing the covers for their Japanese translations. Takamatsu's artworks were also used for book covers of Japanese authors, such as Hajime Shinoda and Yuko Tsushima.

=== From Space to Environment (1966) ===
In November 1966, Takamatsu participated in From Space to Environment, a landmark two-part exhibition and event program in Tokyo that greatly influenced architecture, design, visual art, and music in Japan. Namely, the Environment Society (Enbairamento no Kai] (which held the event) put forth the notion of kanyko geijutsu [environment art], which considered the chaotic site as a locus for artists and viewers to consider the limitations of medium conventions and institutional spaces—which naturally related to Takamatsu's practice. While kankyo referred specifically to the location of such artistic activity, the practices of the 38 participating artists reflected a vested interested in intermedia art, envisage and enacted in the spatial dimensions of kankyo. Many of these artists, including Takamatsu, would go on to participate in Expo '70, conflating the terms intermedia, kankyo and technology in art discourse.

Takamatsu's entry to this exhibition was Chairs and the Table in Perspective (1966), a sculpture-installation work from his Perspective series. He would later continue presenting works from this series at Venice Biennale and Expo '70. Chairs and the Table in Perspectively perspectivally distorted a dining set rendered with a grid-line veneer, the slanted base of the installation demonstrating linear perspective for the viewer. However, manifesting perspective meant the chair and tables were effectively unusable. Tōno Yoshiaki suggested that Takamatsu's work assaulted the normative human perception of single-point perspective as well as the assumption that everyday objects should always look the same.

=== Tama Art University (1968-1972) and Mono-ha ===
Between 1968 and 1972, Takamatsu taught at Tama Art University, Tokyo, and was a key figure in the development of the Mono-ha movement. Takamatsu's deep knowledge of topological geometry and principles of absence/emptiness were particularly influential on his students, such as Nobuo Sekine and other Mono-ha artists.

However, one of the key differences that distinguishes Takamatsu's practice from Mono-ha is the presence, or direct influence, of an artists' creative subjectivity in the final form of the work. While many Mono-ha artists like Lee Ufan centered the objecthood of things as they were through his principle renunciation of his artistic subjectivity, Takamatsu's work featured objects that were clearly manipulated with through meticulous plans.

During Takamatsu's tenure at Tama Art University, there were resurgences of student protests over the impending renewal of the Anpo US-Japan security treaty in 1970. Artists in Japan were critical of the Japanese establishment for their handling of the student protests and the unrest caused some art schools to become closed temporarily and in some cases, permanently. During partial closures, Takamatsu would review student's work and hold free classes outside the university. Interestingly enough, Takamatsu would go on to show at many international exhibitions that were situated within similar anti-government protests, both at the Venice Biennale and Expo '70. At the Venice Biennale in 1968, Takamatsu became friendly with artist and printmaker, Hitoshi Nakazato, who joined him as teacher at Tama Art University in 1968.

=== Venice Biennale (1968) ===
Takamatsu was included in the Japanese Pavilion for the 33rd Venice Biennale (1968) by art critic Hariu Ichirō, alongside Miki Tomio, Sugai Kumi, and Yamaguchi Katsuhiro. Takamatsu was awarded the Carlo Cardazzo Prize, which was an award intended for an outstanding Italian or foreign artist (only for the 34th Venice Biennale).

Hariu was a proponent that Japan's pavilion should be conceived as providing a platform for “international contemporaneity” [kokusaiteki dōjisei], where Japanese artists could appear in dialogue with their peers overseas. Hariu did not envisage this as mere assimilation, but rather recognised that the difference of Japanese experimental practices would have to be pronounced. His vision was consistent with the leading art critics in the 1960s, Sano Takahiko noting that the Biennale was shifting to prioritising experimental practices, and should be seen as a form of cultural diplomacy. Their commentaries led to the International Art Association supporting and restructuring the planning for the Japanese pavilion, namely allowing commissioners to serve two consecutive terms. This was intended to enable continuity across editions, as well as allowing for additional lead time in preparing the latter pavilion. The first three commissioners selected in this period (1968–78) were the progressive critics Hariu Ichirō, Tōno Yoshiaki, and Nakahara Yūsuke, also known in Japan as the “Big Three” [go-sanke].

Takamatsu presented a work from his Perspective series that was similar to Chairs and the Table in Perspective, though in this installation he used curvilinear lines instead of orthogonals to manifest a perspective, with reciprocal curved triangular sections on the floor and the ceiling. The ceiling pieces appeared to grow out from the horizon (situated near the corner of the exhibition walls), curving upwards towards the ceiling. The floor sections resembled his previous work, with distorted or canted Chairs and Tables, while the ceiling sections were embellished with dots of varying sizes. Compared to Chairs and the Table in Perspective, this installation was more aesthetically playful, with the ceiling pieces emphasising a fuller distortion of space.

Despite the call to boycott the Biennale due to student protests in Italy, the artists represented at the Japan pavilion decided collectively to move forward with the Biennale as they believed their actions would not contribute in a meaningful way to the Italian students plight. They collectively echoed Hariu's ambition to elevate Japanese presence on the international art stage.

=== Expo '70 (1970) ===
Takamatsu designed Sunday Plaza (1970) for Expo '70, considering Suita's landscape in his preparatory sketches. It is one of the few more architecturally-scaled works in his Perspective series.

Similar to his Slack and earlier Perspective works, Takamatsu envisioned Sunday Plaza as a curvilinear forced perspective marked with curved grid lines, yet distinct as visitors were supposed to be able to traverse from the foreground into the viewing area of raised background. The inverse perspective background was to be an inclined structure that visitors could use as a viewing vantage point. It was to be made of glass, as compared to the concrete on the floor grids, reflecting the sky and hence further complicating this perspective. Alternate grids in the receding perspective area would be raised to be seats for visitors (which was eventually actualised, unlike the rest of his designed features). Notably, Takamatsu had planned to install Sunday Plaza in a location that was situated near existing hills, with the inclined background at the highest point, in order to pronounced the distorted and inverse perspective lines.

Unfortunately, Takamatsu's plans were not fully executed, with another large installation positioned right behind Sunday Plaza and compressing the optical effects of this Perspective piece. The eventual inclined background was not walkable, though it still reflected the sky.

=== Tokyo Biennale '70—Between Man and Matter (1970) ===
Curated by the art critic Yusuke Nakahara, Tokyo Biennale '70 established the foundations of contemporary Japanese art by emphasising the importance of concepts (gainen), processes and systems in international art practices. The exhibition traveled from Tokyo, to other cities such as Nagoya, Kyoto, and Fukuoka.

Nakahara produced two catalogues for the exhibition (the first with Nakahira Takuma's cover photo and the second documentary volume with a black cover). The first catalogue includes the participating artists own contributions of their biography and tentative work plans. Takamatsu chose to show installations from his Oneness series, and included the development of his varied series in his list of activities and exhibitions. He wrote the following text, which succinctly describes the philosophical tenets of his practice.

"It seems that there is always great uncertainty in our being concerned only with particular (partial) elements of s matter. I think therefore it is necessary to have more total relation to a matter within the range of our own capacity. Some times such relation arises merely from our being aware of s matter and hardly with any effort but for most occasions some action is required. To me this action is artistic creation. A huge problem here is how to reject and eliminate ss much ss possible what compells us to be related merely to particular elements, for example, feelings and ideas in general, imaginations, memories, conventions, and the knowledge which we have already acquired. The solution of this problem always requires that fats/ compromise which is inevitable in any process of actualization, which however tends towards impossibility. Because it is impossible to have a perfectly total relation to a matter. Nevertheless it seems to me that all the problems do not exist in the sphere far from our familiar world, but most problems should be found in the world which is even too familiar to us."

Takamatsu decided to show Oneness (16 Oneness) (1970) and Oneness (30 Oneness) (1970), the former consisting of partially carved Japanese cedar trunks, and the later being made out of paper. Takamatsu had originally envisaged the Oneness (16 Oneness) installation as a 3x3 grid (9 Oneness), but adapted the installation to fit the dimensions of the gallery space he was allocated. Takamatsu insisted upon carving the cedar blocks in the space itself, after they were placed within their 4x4 grid formation. Takamatsu deliberately chipped away at these blocks with varied levels of resultant exposure, producing a range of how much each block was carved out.

=== Documenta 6 (1977) ===
Takamatsu's chosen work for Documenta 6 in 1977 was one of his last sculptural works. Rusty Ground was a combination of three plans Takamatsu had provided curator Manfred Schneckenburger, all based on previous Compoundworks. Originally conceived as a combination of works installed both inside a gallery and outdoors, Takamatsu had to adapt his plan when the exhibition planners included more artists who only had works suitable for indoor showing.

== Work ==
Emptiness or absence for Takamatsu meant 100 percent potentiality (future), an evocation of a perfect reality without worlding or imaging it. Thus, Takamatsu's practice questions the act of seeing, consistent in his collaborations with Hi-Red Center and the Mono-ha artists. Furthermore, Takamatsu explored the differences between facts and experiences of perception, or how (visual) information is received versus how it is processed into meaning. Takamatsu wrote that human perception was inherently biased, and in order to be able to “pursue the consummate forms of things”, the artist must turn that investigation “into art.” Takamatsu's visual manipulations called into question the discrepancy between vision and real existence, between ‘to see’ and ‘to be’.

=== Series ===
Hiroyuki Nakanishi has considered Takamatsu's practice of producing similar works within sustained series as Takami[elevated place], the distillation of his concepts through the iterative making process. While Takamatsu was known for his rigorous planning prior to the fabrication of a work, he was also known to pay particular attention to the site-specificity of his works, and thus adjusted the materials used from edition to edition. This is documented in the production processes of Oneness at Tokyo Biennale '70 and Compound at Documenta 6.

==== Point (1961-1964) ====
Takamatsu began his series of bent-wire works entitled Point series with Point (No. 1) (1961). Point was Takamatsu's Exploration of "a single centripetal unit that cannot be divided any further", not simply a geometric term, however, but a singular moving entity that straddled the space-time of reality and emptiness.

In The World Expansion Project, Takamatsu noted how "things divide infinitely, before the quantum mechanics quest. Imagine for a moment the elementary particle which is the ultimate of division. It is ceaselessly potentiality, it is emptiness itself with infinitely increasing density". Adrian Ogas notes that Takamatsu may have had a vision that the “points” represented as a cluster of accumulated lines of cells that are creating existence, self-propagating to build a life form as yet unseen. It [string] is the non-material, abstract, conceptual object that is length (can also be thought of as line,or point extended), Takamatsu started from the concept of a line in Euclidean geometry as “breadth-less length,” in other words, a line according to metaphysics.

==== String (1962-1998) ====
String plays on the extension and contraction of length, challenging the unit of measure as a stable mode of cognition dependent upon subdivision. Takamatsu was not primarily interested with the figural or aesthetic (thick/thin/color) properties of string, but rath er understood it as length itself. Takamatsu saw string as a form of minimal materiality that could be abstracted and contrasted against the concept of volume, when string is placed within different containers such as a bottle. This led to his The String in the Bottle series (1963–85), each edition of the work demonstrating the string-line contracted (within the bottle) and expanded (leading out of the bottle), irrespective of the form of the bottle. One of the most noted editions is no. 1125, featuring the iconographically infamous Coca-cola bottle; yet the appearance and branding of the bottle was insignificant to Takamatsu in relation to his conception of string. In some editions, such as with no. 1133, Takamatsu used two strings, again illustrating that the form of the string was not of priority to him. Beyond the abstracted length exemplified by string, Takamatsu also used to series to worlds—prompting things enter into unexpected associations by attaching everyday objects to his ropes and cords.

==== Shadow (1964-1998) ====
Takamatsu was inspired to paint the Shadow in order to create images that exist solely in our imagination, using his theory of absence to world what actually exists nowhere. These paintings, ranging in scale, figure, complexity and light source, show an object that is both present and absent, traced and imagined. These are shadows of people and objects long since departed, prompting viewers to consider the anti-reality or existence beyond the third dimension.

==== Perspective (1966-1971) ====
Yoshiaki Tōno noted that the Perspective series can be considered a logical evolution of the Shadow paintings. The space created in the Perspective series using reverse perspective effects was a three-dimensional variation of that in the "Shadow" series. Takamatsu models worlds that are discomforting, proposing a perceivable dimension where the rule of perspective that underlies our sense of perception is reversed, or recanted.

==== Slack (1968-1972) ====
Slack is Takamatsu's grid installation series. Slack of Net features cords tied into a grid-like net, while Slack of Clothconsists of rectangular pieces of cloth sewn together to form square shapes. Both are formed with a taut square perimeter, but are constructed to have slack in the centre of the square. The works are displayed on walls and on the floor, in order to visualise the gravity affected the slacked construction and the space it occupied in the gallery space respectively. Slackcan be understood as a continuation of the Perspective series, in which the representation and perception of space is distorted by Takamatsu's mode of centering optical effects in the physical construct of these installations. However, unlike Perspective, Slack was not well received, its immediate visual appearance of sagging in the centre of the square (grids) deemed ineffective as a structure or visualisation. However, this doubt is easily quelled when one views Takamatsu's Slack plans on grid paper, in which he details the dimensions of the individual pieces compromising the internal grids of the nets that are irregular parallelograms on the grid paper.

==== Oneness (1969-1970) ====
Takamatsu chiseled the top of logs with their bark intact to reveal square-shaped cores within, halting this process of revelation in a hanging suspension. Lee Ufan describes this hanging state as showing "what is there is visible to us, no longer as wood, lumber, or any other such similar thing. In this state, the wood's internal idea intersects, dually and reciprocally, with its externality." By exposing the relationship between lumber and log, Takamatsu occasions a situatedness in which wood can be seen beyond (its objectivity as) wood. That is why most people will gradually notice that they are looking not at mere "wood" but at a "relationship" in the delimited situatedness of the wood.

Duncan observes Takamatsu's process of transforming the ordinary object and material to be secondary to his questioning of our ability to conceive the one-ness of things in their different and multiple forms. Takamatsu was interested in the totality of an object, “If one were to only create a relationship with a specific (a partial) element of a thing, a strong feeling of uncertainty toward that thing would always remain . . . I feel that it is necessary for one to create a relationship with that thing in its entirety within the extent of one's capability.” Takamatsu would go on to develop the Onenessseries by utilising other kinds of materials (singular per edition), such as concrete and paper.

==== Compound ====
Continuing a deregulation of form, Takamatsu's Compound series poses objects consisting of assemblages which undo our assumptions of form. Chairs are rendered unseat-able by positioning a brick underneath its leg, slabs of iron and brass posed as weightless by being held up by a piece of thin string. Whether shapes are generated or undermined. Takamatsu's interest exclusively centers on shapes, not on materials.

==== Photograph of a Photograph (1972-1973) ====
Takamatsu hired a professional photographer to capture snapshots taken from Takamatsu's family albums, which were placed on various walls and surfaces in his home and study. This series was Takamatsu's investigation into how photography relates to memory and appropriation. In each image, the contextualised image, and act of viewing a photograph, are perceived with some form of obfuscation—by glare, reflection, or shadow. This series shows photographing as a nonelite activity, the internal images showing everyday subject matter while being shot in relation the floor, in the darkroom chemical bath, or casually held by visible hands. The viewer of Takamatsu's Photograph of a Photograph is prompted to contemplate with a surreal gaze-within-a-gaze, drawn into a ritualistic reenactment of personal history and hazy recollection.

==== Andromeda (1998-1999) ====
From 1988 to 1989 he worked on a series of screen prints entitled Andromeda.

==== Illustrations ====
As noted above, Takamatsu was very precise about his artwork plans, which was consistent with his illustrations. Quite a number of his drawings were rendered on graph paper, with scale calculation figures in the margin. In some pictures lines were clearly re-drawn, which serves as evidence of how he worked hard to adjust outlines until he formed a satisfactory shape. He also attached color reference samples and detailed color instructions to sketches and original pictures for book illustrations, indicating that he wanted his intentions about color to be fully understood.

=== Printmaking ===
==== English Words (1970) and Japanese Letters (1970) ====
As with his approach to form, Takamatsu processed language as material to be broken down. Takamatsu created these offset lithograph works in a project sponsored by Xerox. In an iterative process, Takamatsu photocopied paper with the text "These/Three/Words" and “この七つの文字 [Kono nanatsu no moji/these seven characters]” respectively, enlarged through 100 rounds. Takamatsu signed each iteration, noting the individual details of defects and decay in each piece. These works have been compared to Joseph Kosuth's text-based work.

==== The Story (1972) ====
In 1972 Takamatsu received the Grand International Prize for The Story at the eighth Tokyo Kokusai Hanga Biennāre[Tokyo International Biennial of Prints].

"The Story" was produced in the same collaboration with Xerox. Takamatsu xeroxed typescript of four chapters from an "unfinished story" of the alphabet. The first chapter started with "a b c d e ... " and finished with "x y z," the book moving on to "aa ab ac ... aaa bbb ... " in subsequent chapters, working through the fourth chapter, which covered the entire second volume without exhausting the fourletter combinations. This unusual "print" amounts to a dissection of words or their elements in a raw, nonfunctional state.

=== Writing ===
Takamatsu was not considered an art critic but was frequently in conversation with art critic contemporaries. Japanese critics frequently referenced statements by Euro-american artists, and artists like Marcel Duchamp influenced the anti-art movements of Japan.

Takamatsu's writing was loosely theoretical in nature, making marked observations about the interconnectedness of sociality and objects. In a series of essays titled “Sekai kakudai keikaku” (“A Plan for World Ex-pansion”), Takamatsu portrays an ever-evolving complexification of social ties. Yoshida Kenchi describes Takamatsu's rose as reminiscent of Allan Kaprow's description of happenings, moving through imaginary and hallucinatory moments with a tone more passive than active. Each detail leads to another without any rational direction as objects keep piling up and getting stuck to one another. "This cacophony of things, images, events, and bodies in Takamatsu's essay “Fuzai tai no tameni [For That Which That Does Not Exist]" turn into four lengthy rope-like sentences meandering through the complex intertwining of subjecthood and objecthood. His reflection on everyday experience recounts the boredom and countless things combining into interminable series that hopelessly postpone the conclusion."

== Exhibitions ==
=== Selected solo exhibitions ===
- 1966 Jiro Takamatsu “Identification”, Tokyo Gallery, Tokyo
- 1996 Jiro Takamatsu at Present, Niigata City Art Museum, Niigata and Mitaka City Gallery of Art, Tokyo
- 1967 Jiro Takamatsu, Naviglio2-Galleria d’Arte, Milano, Italia
- 1999 Jiro Takamatsu―Paintings and Drawings for “Shadow”, The National Museum of Art, Osaka
- 2000 Jiro Takamatsu―1970s Three-dimensional Works and Others, Chiba City Museum of Art, Chiba
- 2004 Jiro Takamatsu―Universe of His Thoughts, Fuchu Art Museum, Tokyo and Kitakyushu Municipal Museum of Art, Fukuoka
- 2009 Permanent Collection 3 Jiro Takamatsu Collection in Hiroshima “Point’ ‘Line’ ‘Form of Absence”, Hiroshima-City Museum of Contemporary Art, Hiroshima
- 2011 Jiro Takamatsu Words and Things – Refinement and Tautology – NADiff Gallery, Tokyo
- 2014 Takamatsu Jiro: Mysteries, The National Museum of Modern Art, Tokyo
- 2015 Jiro Takamatsu: Trajectory of Work, The National Museum of Art, Osaka
- 2017 Jiro Takamatsu: The Temperature of Sculpture, Henry Moore Institute, Leeds, UK

=== Selected group exhibitions ===
- 1958 The 10th Yomiuri Indépendant Exhibition, Tokyo Metropolitan Art Museum, Tokyo
- 1963 Room in Alibi, Naiqua Gallery, Tokyo
- 1963 The 15th Yomiuri Indépendant Exhibition, Tokyo Metropolitan Art Museum, Tokyo
- 1967 5e Biennale de Paris, Manifestation Biennale et Internationale des Jeunes Artistes, Musee d’Art Moderne de la Ville de Paris, Paris, France
- 1968 La Biennale de Venezia, 34. Esposizione Internazionale d’Arte, Venezia, Italia
- 1970 The 10th Tokyo Biennale—Between Man and Matter, Tokyo Metropolitan Art Museum, Tokyo and Kyoto Municipal Museum of Art, Kyoto and others
- 1971 6th Guggenheim International Exhibition, Solomon R. Guggenheim Museum, New York, USA
- 1977 Documenta 6, Kassel, Deutschland
- 1981 The A Decade of Change in Contemporary Japanese Art, The National Museum of Modern Art, Tokyo and The National Museum of Modern Art, Kyoto
- 1985 Reconstructions: Avant-Garde Art in Japan 1945-1965, Museum of Modern Art Oxford, Oxford, UK/Fruitmarket Gallery, Edinburgh, UK
- 1986 Japon des Avant-Gardes, 1910-1970, Le Centre National d’Art et de Culture Georges Pompidou, Paris, France
- 1994 Japanese Art after 1945: Scream against the Sky, Yokohama Museum of Art, Kanagawa; Guggenheim Museum SoHo, New York, USA; San Francisco Museum of Modern Art in association with the Center for the Arts at Yerba Buena Gardens, San Francisco,
- 1995 Matter and Perception 1970: Mono-ha and the Search for Fundamentals, The Museum of Fine Arts Gifu, Gifu; Hiroshima City Museum of Contemporary Art, Hiroshima and others
- 2000 Japanese Art in the 20th Century―100 Years Depicted by Art, Museum of Contemporary Art Tokyo, Tokyo
- 2006 Tokyo―Berlin / Berlin―Tokyo, Mori Art Museum, Tokyo
- 2010 Shadows: Works from the National Museums of Art, The National Art Center, Tokyo
- 2012 Tokyo 1955 – 1970: A New Avant-Garde, The Museum of Modern Art, New York
- 2012 Collection: Focus on Mono-ha―Japanese Art of the‘70s, The National Museum of Art, Osaka
- 2012 Tama and the Present Time” Permanent Exhibition, Fuchu Art Museum, Tokyo
- 2013 Tricks and Vision to Mono-ha, Tokyo Gallery + Beijing Art Projects
- 2015 For a New World to Come, Experiments in Japanese Art and Photography, 1968–1979, The Museum of Fine Arts, Houston, USA／Grey Art Gallery, New York University, USA／Japan Society Gallery, USA
- 2016 Provoke: Photography in Japan between Protest and Performance, 1960-1975, The Art Institute of Chicago, USA
- 2018 Minimalism: Space. Light. Object., National Gallery Singapore, Singapore
- 2019 DECODE: Events & Records–Post-Industrial Art, The Museum of Modern Art, Saitama
- 2019 INSIDE OUT: JIRO TAKAMATSU AND KEIJI UEMATSU IN CONVERSATION / An exhibition of post-war Japanese sculpture, Royal Society of Sculptors, Dora House, London, UK

== Collection ==
The Takamatsu Jiro Estate is managed by Yumiko Chiba Associates. Takamatsu's work is also found in the following institutional collections.

- The National Museum of Modern Art, Tokyo
- The National Museum of Art, Osaka
- Museum of Contemporary Art Tokyo
- Solomon R. Guggenheim Museum
- Minneapolis Institute of Art
- The Dallas Museum of Art
- The Museum of Modern Art, New York
- Tate
- Pace Gallery
- The Rachofsky Collection
