= Tanemura =

Tanemura (written: 種村 lit. "seed/kind/species, village") is a Japanese surname. Notable people with the surname include:

- Arina Tanemura (種村 有菜, born 1978), Japanese manga artist
- Naoki Tanemura (種村 直樹, born 1936), Japanese writer, critic and essayist
- Suehiro Tanemura (種村 季弘, 1933–2004), Japanese translator, critic and essayist
