= Kisha club =

Japanese press association

A kisha club (記者クラブ, kisha kurabu; "reporters' club") is a Japanese news-gathering association of reporters from specific news organizations, whose reporting centers on a press room set up by sources such as the Prime Minister's Official Residence, government ministries, local authorities, the police, or corporate bodies. In English, it also called a Press Club.

Institutions with a kisha club limit their press conferences to the journalists of that club, and membership rules for kisha clubs are restrictive. This blocks access by domestic non-member media, such as magazines and smaller newspapers, and the foreign media, as well as freelance reporters, to the press conferences.

While similar arrangements exist in other countries, the Japanese form of this type of organization is seen as one of the most extreme, with journalists actively denying access to other journalists, which has led to use of the Japanese term in other languages, often with a critical meaning.

== History ==
1890
In response to the ban imposed by the first Imperial Diet on reporting by newspaper reporters, a reporter from the Jiji Shinpō (時事新報) newspaper called together the Diet correspondents from the Tokyo newspapers to form a "Group of journalists visiting the Diet" (議会出入記者団, Gikai deiri kishadan), which in October merged with newspaper companies across Japan, changing its name to the Associated Newspaper Journalists' Club (共同新聞記者倶楽部, Kyōdō Shinbun Kisha Kurabu), to become the first kisha club.
March 1941
With the formation of the "Japan Newspaper Union" (日本新聞連盟, Nihon Shinbun Renmei), a newspaper control organization, the number of kisha clubs was reduced to one third, and kisha clubs were forbidden from governing themselves.
October 26, 1949
The Japan Newspaper Publishers and Editors Association created a "Policy on Kisha Clubs", stating that they were "an organization for the purpose of socialization, and are not to intervene in matters related to reporting".
December 1997
The Japan Newspaper Publishers and Editors Association changed this policy, stating that kisha clubs were "bases for reporting" which allowed easy access to information held by public bodies.
March 24, 2005
Livedoor became the first Internet media company to apply for membership of the Japan Meteorological Agency kisha club.
However, on March 15, 2006, the former president of Livedoor, Takafumi Horie, was charged with a breach of the Securities Trading Law (証券取引法, Shōken Torihiki Hō), and for this reason the application was rejected unanimously by the companies present.
July 9, 2005
The freelance journalist Yū Terasawa (寺澤有) and the deputy editor of the Shūkan Gendai (週刊現代) weekly magazine submitted an application for a provisional ruling against the Tokyo Metropolitan Police and the 15 companies in the related kisha club to the Tokyo District Court and Tokyo High Court, stating that groups such as kisha clubs must not be allowed to obstruct journalists wishing to attend at the offices of the Metropolitan Police and give questions, but the application was refused. A special appeal is being made to the Tokyo High Court.
November 8, 2005
When a journalist from NHK Ōtsu bureau was arrested in relation to an arson incident, the offices of the Shiga Prefecture Police kisha club to which he belonged were searched by the Shiga Prefecture Police.

=== Reporting agreements ===
Kisha clubs often make agreements on reporting, which are known as "blackboard agreements" (黒板協定, kokuban kyōtei) because they are communicated via a blackboard in a press room. The aim of making reporting agreements is often to avoid excessive competition during reporting. Agreements may also be made based on a request by, for example, the police, to protect the victims in cases such as kidnappings. These backroom agreements came under criticism following the 2011 Fukushima Daiichi nuclear disaster, when they were blamed for causing journalists to self-censor, and limit their coverage to official announcements by government and plant officials.

== Magazine kisha clubs ==
In 1956, the J-Magazine (日本雑誌協会, Nihon Zasshi Kyokai) association was set up, containing "Japanese magazine kisha clubs (日本雑誌記者会, nihon zasshi kishakai) and Japanese magazine photo-journalist clubs (日本雑誌写真記者会, nihon zasshi shashin kishakai), formed from member companies, to expedite the reporting activities related to magazine editing".

== Disadvantages of kisha clubs ==
The kisha clubs have been widely criticized, both in Japan and abroad, for encouraging an extreme type of access-driven journalism that undermines the quality of journalism in Japan by stifling criticism and turning reporters into mouthpieces for the institutions that they are supposed to cover. In one representative criticism, Jonathan Watts, the former Tokyo bureau chief for The Guardian, said the kisha club create a problem of "watchdogs becoming lapdogs" because "the kisha-club system rewards self-censorship, fosters uniformity and stifles competition."

In its 2023 rankings of World Press Freedom, the non-governmental group Reporters Without Borders singled out the kisha clubs as a major reason that it ranked Japan 68th out of 180 countries, saying, "journalists find it hard put to fully play their role as democracy’s watchdog."

Smaller media companies, freelance journalists and foreign news organizations are often blocked from joining kisha clubs, leading to one of the most common criticisms, that the clubs foster opaque, exclusive ties between government officials and member journalists, who become overly reliant on their sources for information.

There have been cases when members of kisha clubs have been subject to penalties, such as being forbidden from attending the kisha club, for reporting information that was supposed to be kept secret, or that challenged the official narrative of the government agency where the club was based. In 2009, reporters for the Tokyo Shimbun, a regional newspaper, were banned from talking with Tokyo prosecutors for three weeks for naming a governing Liberal Democratic Party politician in their coverage of a political corruption scandal, when prosecutors were focusing their investigation solely on an opposition leader, Ichiro Ozawa.

There is criticism that press rooms set up for kisha clubs by government agencies, local public bodies and the police are paid for with taxes, but can only be used by the member companies, leading to corruption. If local government agencies are included, the total yearly costs are thought to run to 600 million yen.

In 1921, a gas company bribed the Tokyo City Council (東京市議会, Tokyo-shi gikai) to gain approval for a rise in gas prices. It was discovered that newspaper reporters attending the city hall and Tokyo Metropolitan Police kisha clubs had also been bribed, an event condemned by public opinion. (The Tokyo Gas suspected bribery incident.)

In 1974, when the weekly magazine Bungei Shunshū reported on the Kakuei Tanaka funding problem, the allegations were already well known in the kisha club but the media was silent about the story.

In 1998, during the broadcast of TBS' TV program Sōri to Kataru (総理と語る), "A Conversation with the Prime Minister", News 23 anchor Tetsuya Chikushi suggested to the prime minister of the time, Keizō Obuchi that, given the success of the Town Meetings held by President Bill Clinton, also shown by TBS, perhaps Obuchi would also like to take part in Clinton-style Town Meetings. Obuchi was keen, but the plan was scuppered due to opposition from the kisha club, and in the end Sori to Kataru continued to be shown in the same format as before. (Chikushi related these events in his book, Newscaster. Incidentally, Chikushi is known for having a critical stance towards kisha clubs.)

In 1999, there was an incident where some members of the media had a row with staff at the Ministry of Agriculture, Farming and Fisheries over the display of a Japanese flag at the meeting hall of the ministry kisha club. This was just after the National Flag and National Anthem Law was passed, in the midst of a debate about whether the government was forcing groups to display flags. In response to actions by some sections of the media, there was criticism from both those in favor of the National Flag and National Anthem Law and those against, including comments such as "They shouldn't be making a scene inside Ministry buildings in the first place" and "Isn't this just a sign of the egotism of kisha clubs?"

In 2000, the then Prime Minister Keizō Obuchi suddenly made telephone calls to Nippon TV and TV Asahi, and was allowed to appear live on these channels. The related kisha clubs criticized TV Asahi, saying that this was "unprecedented". (Nippon TV was not criticized.)

On June 25, 2000, some notes titled "A personal view on tomorrow's press conference" were found lying on the ground at the Cabinet Kisha Club (内閣記者会, Naikaku Kisha Kai), a kisha club in the grounds of the Japanese Prime Minister's official residence. This was the day before the meeting at which Prime Minister Yoshirō Mori was due to make an explanation about his "Kami no kuni" statements about religion in Japan, and the notes appeared to be a set of directions to the Prime Minister on how to handle questions from the media. Even though weekly news magazines published the name of the media organization (NHK) responsible for writing the document, the Cabinet Kisha Club did not take an active efforts to investigate the cause of the incident. The format in which the document was printed was the same as that of "communication e-mails" from the 5300 system terminals used for printing NHK stories, and the document also contained a term meaning "private broadcasters", minpō (民放), which was only likely to have been used by NHK.

There has been criticism that the main work of reporters in a press room tends to be to summarize the contents of press conferences, so that they neglect to check whether what is announced is true and are more easily subject to media manipulation, and that this leads to fewer reporters learning to go out to different locations to do research. Akira Uozumi, a former Kyodo News journalist, stated that kisha clubs slowly wear down reporters psychologically, and blunt their instincts as journalists, saying (in the Asahi Shimbun, on May 26, 2001), that "if 70% or 80% of your job is collecting secondary or tertiary information from government agencies as quickly as possible, it dulls your instinct for sensing what is actually going on in the world. Before you know it, the logic of the civil servants works its way into you, and it gets more difficult to think from the point of view of the people being governed. I thought it wasn't happening to me, but five years after becoming freelance, I gradually began to realize it was."

As a result of this, most media reports are reports of announcements to kisha clubs, a phenomenon unthinkable in a developed country. In addition, there is criticism that the kisha club system decreases the distance between reporters and politicians, leading to improper relationships. As proof of this, Taro Kawano, a member of the House of Representatives, has said that it is normal for reporters (from the Japanese media) to have meals paid for by politicians (which would never happen in any other developed country), that when politicians go on visits reporters stay in the same hotel, and that the media consider that the sign of a "good reporter" is when "the reporter and the politicians are the best of friends". (Quoted in "How the media hide facts, and how the media is being tricked" (隠すマスコミ、騙されるマスコミ, Kakusu masukomi, damasareru masukomi) by Masakazu Kobayashi (小林雅一), published by Bunshun Shinsho (文春新書).) In addition, during the Matsumoto sarin incident, reports based on information given by the Metropolitan Police to a kisha club treated the first witness as a criminal.

There is also the criticism that kisha club are exclusive by nature, and rarely allow representatives of the new media, the foreign media or freelance journalists to join. In response to this, the Japan Newspaper Publishers and Editors Association introduced a policy whereby members from the Foreign Correspondents' Club of Japan would be treated in the same way as members from the Japan Newspaper Publishers and Editors Association, and in the late 1990s admitted Reuters as a member of the Kabuto Club. Since then, foreign-owned media organizations such as Bloomberg and Dow Jones with large-scale information-gathering networks have joined the majority of kisha clubs, and are involved in their administration. However, this has only been possible for a handful of foreign-owned media organizations, and as most foreign media organizations with representatives in Tokyo have only a few reporters there, it is impossible for them to have reporters join and remain present at kisha clubs. In fact, the EU has criticised kisha clubs for being exclusive, and the opinion has been stated that the kisha club system should be abolished, and all journalists with a reporter's pass issued by the Japanese Japanese Ministry of Foreign Affairs allowed to collect material for stories at public institutions. This exclusivity is the reason why foreign journalists were not allowed to attend the police conference on the disappearance and murder of the British woman Lucie Blackman, and that when Prime Minister Koizumi visited the Democratic People's Republic of Korea, non-members of the kisha club were not allowed to accompany him. (Statement by Private Secretary Isao Iijima.) Reporters Without Borders, a journalists' organization which campaigns to protect the rights of journalists to freedom of speech, is calling for the Japanese government to abolish the kisha club system.

== Moves to abolish kisha clubs ==
At a national level, in 1994, Ichirō Ozawa, the head of the Japan Renewal Party, undertook a groundbreaking experiment by allowing magazine reporters not in the kisha club to participate in press conferences, but this never took off, in part due to disagreements between Ozawa and the media.

In 2002, the then head of the Democratic Party of Japan, Katsuya Okada, introduced a format of press conference where all types of media, including sports newspapers, weekly magazines and foreign media organizations, could take part. Until then, only media in the kisha club for opposition parties (野党クラブ, Yatō Kurabu) could take part.

Some heads of local public bodies, business or financial groups have also closed press rooms, having realized the disadvantages of the kisha club system.

In June 1993, the Kabuto Club (兜倶楽部), the kisha club for the Tokyo Stock Exchange, reformed its rules, which until then had restricted membership to Japanese media organizations, to include "foreign media organizations which perform media work equivalent to that of the Japan Newspaper Publishers and Editors Association", a move which in practice opened the door to foreign media organizations.

In April 1996, the city of Kamakura, Kanagawa stopped using the Kamakura kisha club (鎌倉記者会, Kamakura Kisha Kai), which had six companies as members, including national newspapers and the local Kanagawa Shimbun, and opened a "Publicity media center" which could be used by any media organization registered with the city. The then mayor, Ken Takeuchi, formerly of the editing committee of the Asahi Shimbun, and currently head of the internet newspaper "janjan", stated that this was done as it was felt that "it was not reasonable for a city institution funded by tax money to be monopolized by a kisha club which represented only one section of the media".

In March 1999, the Keidanren Kikai Club (経団連機械クラブ) was closed, at the request of Keidanren, the organization controlling it. This kisha club was focused on reporting related to industrial work such as electrical machinery, shipbuilding, semiconductors and automobiles. There was debate between the media and the companies making announcements about continuing with the kisha club, but as no breakthrough solution was found, the club was dissolved. It is thought that the root cause of this event was that electrical makers had been conducting open press conferences, and using press releases and e-mail, so there were no longer advantages to using a kisha club. The automobile industry, wanting to keep a kisha club active, opened an automobile industry kisha club as part of the Japan Automobile Manufacturers Association (日本自動車工業会), but the Asahi, Yomiuri, Mainichi and Nikkei newspapers refused to join, in effect depriving the club of its function.

In July 1999, NTT's kisha club, Aoi Club (葵クラブ) was closed as a result of structural changes at NTT. This club had in the past been subject to criticism for the fact that it was a club dedicated to a single private company, but after the restructuring by NTT, a group of economic editors assembled from the different media companies agreed not to accept the Aoi Club as a kisha club. NTT accepted this and closed the club, with the aim of opening the press room to organizations other than club members, including magazines and the overseas media.

On August 6, 2001, the Tokyo Metropolitan Government requested that the Kajibashi/Yūraku kisha club pay charges for using the Tokyo government offices, but later retracted this, instead requiring only lighting, heating, water and telephone charges to be paid. The Governor of Tokyo, Shintarō Ishihara, also questioned the policy of not allowing magazines or foreign media organizations to participate in press conferences.

On March 30, 2004, the Ministry of Foreign Affairs sent a written request to the central government offices, the offices of each prefecture, the police and other bodies, asking them to allow foreign reporters to participate in press conferences.

On March 14, 2006, due to the harsh financial circumstances it was facing, the Hokkaidō government decided to request payments for lighting, heating, water and other costs, totaling approximately 2.5 million yen, from the Hokkaido government kisha club (道政記者クラブ), starting from the new financial year.

One of the biggest moves against the kisha clubs came in the autumn of 2009, when the opposition Democratic Party (Japan, 1998) took power from the long-governing LDP. The new prime minister, Yukio Hatoyama, opened press conferences at the Prime Minister's Office to non-kisha club reporters from domestic and foreign media, declaring he would "make press conferences more open to everyone." Press conferences at the Ministry of Foreign Affairs were also opened to non-kisha club members of the press. However, when the new financial services minister, Shizuka Kamei, tried to open press conferences at his agency, the Financial Services Agency, the kisha club resisted so ferociously that he was forced to compromise. In an odd arrangement, he gave two back-to-back press conferences, one to the kisha club, and one open to all other journalists. "Japan’s news media are closed," Kamei said during one of the non-kisha club press conferences. “They think they are the only real journalists, but they are wrong.”

=== Nagano Prefecture's "Declaration of the End of Our Kisha Club System" ===
On May 15, 2001, former mayor of Nagano, Yasuo Tanaka, announced a "Declaration of the End of Our Kisha Club System". He closed the three kisha clubs within the prefectural offices, and opened a press center which anyone could use, called the "Expression Center" (表現センター).

The purpose of this was to end the monopoly of the large media companies on information; however, it was fiercely criticized by these companies, and it is reported that this action has resulted in a feud with large media companies both inside and outside the prefecture.

On October 3, 2006, the current mayor, Hitoshi Murai, announced that the "Expression Center" would be renamed the "Press Conference Area" (会見場). In the same way as Tanaka, he allowed members of the public to participate in conferences, subject to submitting an application.

== Major kisha clubs ==
In addition to the kisha clubs listed below, there are clubs for the government of each prefecture.

- Kabuto Club (兜倶楽部) - The kisha club within the Tokyo Stock Exchange. In principle, companies make announcements about events which are likely to have a major effect on share prices at this club.
- Tokiwa Club (ときわクラブ) - The kisha club of the former Japanese National Railways. At present, it is based at the head offices of JR East. As most reporters concerned with transport normally work at the Ministry of Land, Infrastructure and Transport, few are permanently stationed at the Tokiwa club. During his time as a reporter with the Asahi Shimbun, Naoki Tanemura belonged to the club, and the fiction he wrote as a railway writer contained several names which were variations on the name "Tokiwa".
- Kasumi Club (霞クラブ) - The kisha club of the Ministry of Foreign Affairs. Reporters from the mass media in Japan and overseas are stationed here.
- Ministry of Land, Infrastructure and Transportation Kisha Club (国土交通省記者クラブ) - This kisha club was formed from a union of the clubs for the Ministry of Transport, Ministry of Construction and National Land Agency. Its nature as a combination of different groups can often be observed; for example, a reporter covering traffic policy may be sitting next to a reporter covering the disposal of debts by general construction companies.
- Heavy Industries Research Club (重工業研究会) - A kisha club at the Japan Iron and Steel Federation in Chūō, Tokyo. Despite its location, resident reporters cover a range of industries, including metals other than steel, chemistry, textiles, rubber, paper, glass, cosmetics, personal care goods (such as those from Lion or Kao), pharmaceuticals and apparel. It has the widest range of areas covered of any kisha club. Because of its name, it is often wrongly thought to be a club covering businesses such as Mitsubishi Heavy Industries or Ishikawajima-Harima Heavy Industries.
- Honseki Textiles Club (本石繊維会) - A club in Honseki-chō, Nihonbashi, Tokyo, which serves as a base for reporters covering the textile and paper industries. It is not an official club, but a subdivision of the heavy industries club, with which it merged in 2002.
- Bank of Japan Club (日銀クラブ) - This is a club within the Bank of Japan, whose resident reporters cover not only the Bank itself but also private organizations such as banks and insurance agencies.
- Automobile Industry Kisha Club (自動車産業記者会) - Initially, this was a subdivision of the Keidan Kikai Club, but became a club in its own right when the Kikai Club closed in 1999. However, the four major newspapers, the Nikkei, Asahi, Yomiuri and Mainichi, decided not to participate in it, it is not recognized as a kisha club by the Newspaper Association. The Nikkan Jidosha Shimbun, which is not a member of the Newspaper Association, is a resident company at the automobile club.
- Tokyo Chamber of Commerce and Industry Kisha Club (東商記者クラブ) - The kisha club at the Tokyo Chamber of Commerce and Industry in Marunouchi, Tokyo. This club was established with the aim of allowing the mass media to report on small businesses. However, in practice, there is next to no reporting on small businesses, and instead it is a base for reporting on the delivery, service, non-banking financial and food businesses. The Tokyo Chamber of Commerce and Industry has repeatedly expressed discontent about this, and asked for it to be used to report on small businesses, but this has not come about. For this reason, the relationship between the media and the Tokyo Chamber of Commerce and Industry concerning the running of the club has not always been a close one, and there have often been rumors that the club may close.
- Seitō Club (青灯倶楽部)
- Nagata Club (永田クラブ) - A kisha club within the official residence of the Japanese Prime Minister. In recent times, it has often been referred to as the Kantei Club (官邸クラブ), but its official name is Cabinet Kisha Club (内閣記者会). Reporters belonging to this club report mainly on the prime minister, Chief Cabinet Secretary, Deputy Cabinet Secretary, the official residence and the cabinet.
- Eiho Club (映放クラブ) - A club at the House of Representatives in the National Diet with the six Tokyo television stations (NHK, Nippon TV, TBS, Fuji TV, TV Asahi and TV Tokyo) as members. It is the only club in Japan which is exclusively for television news camera operators.
- Minpō Club (民放クラブ) - A club within the House of Representatives which is exclusively for radio news journalists. Its official name is the Diet Broadcast Reporter Club (国会放送記者会). It is mainly used for recording press conferences (ぶらさがり取材). NHK is not a member of this club, as its radio news broadcasts use the audio from its television news broadcast.
- Hirakawa Club (平河クラブ) - A kisha club with offices inside the headquarters of the LDP and at the House of Representatives. The reporters belonging to this club report mainly on the LDP and New Komeito. The club inside the LDP headquarters is referred to as the Party HQ Hirakawa Club (党本部平河), and the club at the House of Representatives is known as the House Hirakawa Club (院内平河). Reporters from the Hirakawa generally attend the club at the House when the Diet is in session, and the HQ when it is out of session.
- Opposition Party Club (野党クラブ, Yatō Kurabu) - A club at the House of Representatives in the National Diet. Reporters at this club cover mainly the Democratic Party of Japan, Japanese Communist Party and Social Democratic Party
- Imperial Household Agency Kisha Club (宮内庁記者クラブ) - Tokyo Metropolitan Police kisha clubs Television reporters often say they are reporting "from the Tokyo Metropolitan Police kisha club", but this is not technically correct. Ignoring the industry newspaper, there are three kisha clubs at the Tokyo Metropolitan Police Department. The Asahi, Mainichi, Yomiuri, Tokyo, Nikkei and Kyōdō news companies are members of the Shichisha Kai (七社会), which means "club of seven companies", as the Jiji Shinpō newspaper was once also a member. This club has the longest history of any of the clubs at the Tokyo Metropolitan Police Department. The NHK, Sankei, Jiji, Nippon Broadcasting, Nippon Cultural Broadcasting and MXTV companies are members of the Tokyo Metropolitan Police Department kisha club (警視庁記者倶楽部). This is the smallest club, and in practice only the first three of these companies are resident. The five private broadcasters, Nippon TV, TBS, Fuji TV, TV Asahi and TV Tokyo, are members of the News Kisha Club (ニュース記者会). These three clubs are run separately, with separate accounts.
- Tokyo Fire Department kisha club (東京消防庁記者クラブ) - Since this is run by the reporters from the police kisha clubs, in practice there are no companies resident here.
- Mita club (三田クラブ) - A kisha club related to the labor movement. In former times, organizations such as the General Council of Trade Unions of Japan provided information, and member newspaper and magazine reporters worked here. At present the Japanese Trade Union Confederation is involved. As two of the news companies, Rodo Joho and Akahata reported on the massive debt incident and the trade union budget spending incident, by the former Japan Postal Workers' Union (now the JPU), the Postal Workers' Union blocked them from becoming members.

== Kisha clubs in other countries ==
In South Korea, there had been similar clubs to the Japanese kisha club system. But since reforms implemented in the early 2000s this system no longer exists between the South Korean government and media. These reforms include change by the media itself, such as the event on June 11, 2001 when 11 local newspapers attending government offices in Seongnam, Gyeonggi-do, including the "Kyongin Ilbo" and "Jeonmae", disbanded the club and withdrew from the conference room, and events such as that in the same year, where the internet newspaper OhmyNews was expelled from a press conference at Incheon International Airport, and issued a lawsuit appealing against its expulsion.

In 2003, due to a policy by President Roh Moo-hyun the press club at the Presidential residence, the Blue House, was disbanded. A conference room open to internet media and foreign media organizations was set up so that anyone who registers can attend.

In the United States, while there are a few clubs which are relatively similar to Japanese kisha clubs, such as the club in the Department of Defense, unlike Japan, these have a salon atmosphere. At the White House, there are secret meetings known as "briefings", to which only specific members of the major mass media companies are invited. However, beside these, there are also press conferences, which any journalist issued with a press pass can attend. On the other hand, in order to obtain a press pass, journalists have to undergo strict security checks from all departments, and the process can take several months. Recently, bloggers reporting news from internet blogs have been issued press passes, which attracted much attention, but it was also found that a reporter from a conservative news website was also running an illegal pornography website, provoking criticism in that the security checks were not good enough to discover the reporter's illegal transactions.

In the United Kingdom, until recently, only reporters with press passes for the Houses of Parliament were allowed to attend briefings, but since Tony Blair took power, freelance journalists have been allowed to participate. In addition, before this reform, briefings were treated as being off the record.

In France, any journalist may be issued with a press card, but in order to receive this, journalists must undergo an investigation by the "press card committee" which issues the cards. With this card, a journalist can enter the President's residence (the Élysée Palace) and attend press conferences at any Ministry.

== Other details ==
Many of the kisha clubs in Japan hold joint informal events (such as end-of-year parties, summer parties and leaving parties) with local government agencies or company publicity departments. This is not illegal, but it is inappropriate behavior for journalists. It is said that the smaller the kisha club, the more pronounced this tendency is.

In 2002, when reports were made about the problem of Cabinet Payment Fund (内閣官房報償費) (the so-called secret Cabinet fund), it was discovered that at end-of-year parties, New Year parties and at the start of holiday tours, the Chief Cabinet Secretary handed "farewell presents" (餞別) to reporters, and this was paid for from the Cabinet Payment Fund.

In 2005, it was found by the city council of Tatebayashi City that the lunches at the regular press conferences held by the mayor of Tatebayashi City and media companies was paid for from public expenses. The city announced the intention of ending these payments.

== External links (in Japanese) ==
Much of this article was translated from the equivalent article from the Japanese Wikipedia, as retrieved on November 20, 2006. That article contains the following external links.

- The view of the Editors' Committee of the Japan Newspaper Publishers and Editors Association on kisha clubs
- "Declaration of the End of Our Kisha Club System" on Nagano Prefecture's official website
- South Korea leads the way with reforms of the kisha club system it has imported
