= Aiko Miyawaki =

Japanese artist

- Born: 20 September 1929; Tokyo, Japan
- Died: 20 August 2014 (aged 84); Yokohama, Japan
- Education: Japan Women's University
- Occupation: Artist
- Known for: sculptures, paintings, drawing
- Spouses: Shunzō Miyawaki (m. 1951; div. 1965); Arata Isozaki (m. 1972–2014)

Aiko Miyawaki (宮脇 愛子, Miyawaki Aiko; 20 September 1929 – 20 August 2014) was a Japanese sculptor and painter. She was best known for her sculpture series titled Utsurohi, installed at public spaces worldwide.

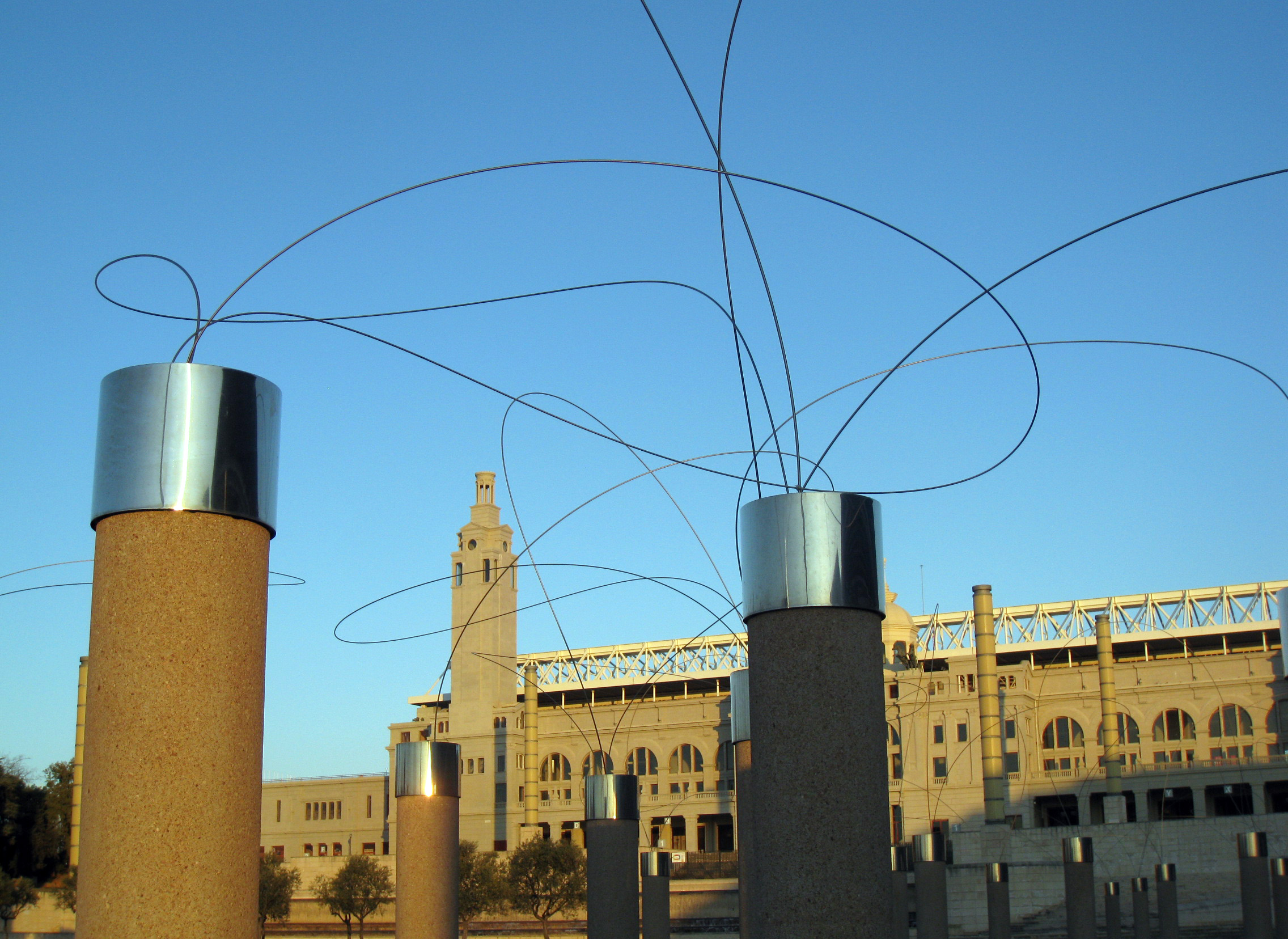
122 Canvi, d'Aiko Miyawaki, i Estadi Olímpic

== Biography ==
=== Early years ===
Born Aiko Araki in Tokyo, Miyawaki moved to Atami, Shizuoka Prefecture with her family at a young age. Miyawaki was known to be a weak child, and her family changed her given name several times to make her stronger. She was once Takako during kindergarten years and then Mikiko when she started school. In March 1946, Miyawaki graduated from the Odawara High School for Girls (now Odawara High School). At Japan Women's University, she studied with historian Noboru Ōrui in the Department of History and her thesis focused on the art of the Momoyama period. She graduated in March 1952. During her university years, she began dating Shunzō Miyawaki, a student in the Department of Western History at the University of Tokyo. The two got married while still in school; they separated in 1960 and divorced in 1965.

=== 1950s to 1960s: paintings and international travels ===
When she was a student, Miyawaki was introduced to the Western-style painter Nobuya Abe through her sister-in-law, the painter Nobuko Kamiya. In 1953, Miyawaki began studying with Abe, who was familiar with art of Europe and America, at Bunka Gakuin. She was introduced to art from overseas and even learned a little Polish since she was interested in Polish art. Also through Kamiya, Miyawaki was introduced to the artist Yoshishige Saitō, and this encounter made her realize the significance of exhibiting her works. Meanwhile, having wanted to know more about art overseas, Miyawaki went to the U.S. for a short time to study painting at the University of California, Los Angeles and Santa Monica City College in 1957.

In the summer of 1959, she visited Vienna to participate in the World Artists Conference (世界美術家会議). Afterwards, Takiguchi Shūzō, who was in the International Association of Art Critics (AICA), recommended Miyawaki to stay in Milan. In Milan, Miyawaki was said to have been introduced by Nobuya Abe to Enrico Baj, who became Miyawaki's guarantor. She also befriended Lucio Fontana, Enrico Castellani, Piero Manzoni, and other artists. Through Gio Ponti’s daughter Lisa Ponti, Miyawaki was connected to the Galleria Minima in Milan, where she would later have a solo exhibition in 1961.

Around 1959, Miyawaki developed a new and innovative series by mixing enamel and marble powder with paint and applying it directly on canvas often with a palette knife to create textured and sometimes patterned surfaces. This body of work was featured in her first solo exhibition at Yōseidō Gallery, Tokyo in December 1959. Some pointed out that her painting surfaces resemble the minute relief surface of Kamakura-bori. When she was asked whether her style was influenced by Art Informel during her time in Milan, she rejected it. Many of her paintings dated between 1958 and 1962 were titled Work (作品, Sakuhin).

In January 1962, Miyawaki temporarily returned to Japan and held her second solo exhibition in Japan at Tokyo Gallery. Her paintings caught the attention of a French art dealer André Schoeller who was visiting Japan at the time. Miyawaki signed a contract with Schoeller and stayed in Paris for a year to produce works and hold exhibitions. Miyawaki got acquainted with Man Ray either around this time in Paris, or earlier in Milan. Against the original plan of returning to Japan from Paris in 1963, she made a stop in New York and stayed there until 1966. She stayed in the Chelsea Hotel for part of her stay, if not the entire period of time. During her New York years, Miyawaki held a solo exhibition at Berta Schaefer Gallery in 1964 and May Ray wrote a foreword to the exhibition catalog. Miyawaki also befriended Richard Lindner, likely during her time in New York.

=== Mid-1960s to 1990s: sculpture and installation ===
After returning to Japan, Miyawaki began taking up sculpture. Miyawaki started to create works using brass pipes, square tubes and cylinders to manifest the effect of light. In October 1966, she exhibited her work at the Guggenheim International Sculpture Exhibition held at the Guggenheim Museum in New York, and her work consisting of brass square tubes received the museum's Purchase Award. Miyawaki recalled that in the creation of these works, she had students from the Department of Architecture at the University of Tokyo helping her in her studio by performing such tasks as polishing the pipes.

In November 1966, Miyawaki participated in the exhibition From Space to Environment, held at the Matsuya department store in Ginza, Tokyo, where she first met the architect and designer Arata Isozaki. For the exhibition, Miyawaki showed Work (ca. 1966) in which she superimposed triangles made of aluminum and melamine resin to create a three-dimensional representation of perspective in a plane.

In November 1968, Miyawaki exhibited a work titled Shindō (振動, "Vibration") at the 5th Nagaoka Contemporary Art Museum Award Exhibition. Around this time, Miyawaki was also creating works with different themes depending on the material. For example, in the MEGU series, each work consisted of a stack of glasses that are collected broken, as opposed to having been manually cut which would not result in the transparency of the entire sculpture that she had planned for. The Listen to Your Portrait series involved Miyawaki engraving "Listen to your portrait" in the language of the country where the work was exhibited on triangular metal or stone plates.

In 1972, Miyawaki married Arata Isozaki. In the same year, she completed her first book design project for Kunio Tsuji's novel, Julian the Apostate. In 1977, Miyawaki exhibited MEGU-1977 at the 7th Contemporary Japanese Sculpture Exhibition, and she divided a triangular prism into three pieces and placed them in a triangular arrangement at a distance. Around this time, she also produced a series titled Scroll Paintings (スクロール・ペインティング), which she painted as if she were scribbling a sutra due to a spiritual impasse.

After that, Miyawaki was invited to enter a sculpture competition organized by the Port Authority in New York. For that project, she experimented with the idea of expressing the free spirit, or "qi (chi)" in Chinese, as if drawing lines in the void. In 1978, Miyawaki participated in the exhibition MA—Espace/ Temps au Japon (「日本の時空間―<間>」) at the Musée des Arts Décoratifs in the Palais du Louvre, which was organized by Isozaki. In a gallery with the theme of "change," she exhibited a folding screen-like work made of brass to respond to the exhibition's central theme, ma (間), which refers to both space and time.

==== Utsurohi (うつろひ) ====
In March 1980, UTSUROI, the first work of Miyawaki's signature Utsurohi series was installed in Hikoda Children's Park in Ichinomiya, Aichi Prefecture. In the Utsurohi series, Miyawaki attempted to achieve a form that excludes any sculptural weight. After a period of material search, she settled on steel wires for some time before discovering that piano wire, made of stainless steel, turned out best suited for her purpose. Through Mukai of Gallery Mukai, Miyawaki was introduced to Mr. Murayama who was the president of a company that makes piano wire. By shaping and suspending the wires in the air, the artist granted the sensation of motion to her work. The wires are both strong yet could also move at the slightest force such as a breeze. These sculptures negotiate with the immediate surrounding and can change in their forms in many ways, echoing the Japanese concept of "utsuroi," which points to "swift change," or "transience."

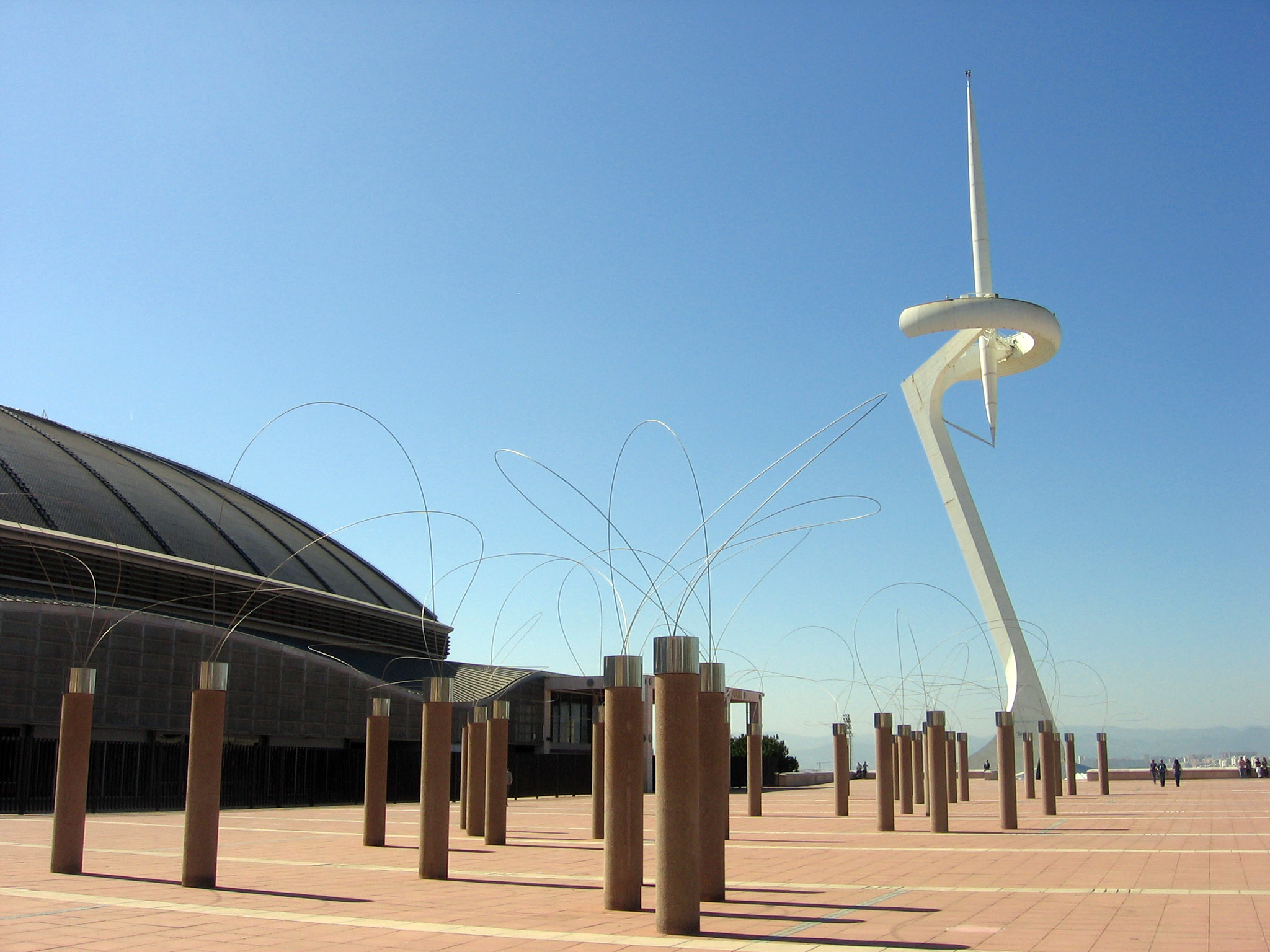
The Utsurohi at the Sant Jordi Sports Palace in Barcelona with the white Montjuïc Communications Tower in the background

In May 1980, in the exhibition Aiko Miyawaki 1960–1980, held at Gallery Takagi in Nagoya, Miyawaki exhibited a new work made of stainless steel wire in almost the same shape as UTSUROI. This time, she herself did the installation at the exhibition venue. In July 1981, Miyawaki exhibited UTSUROI consisting of 12 wires at the 2nd Henry Moore Grand Prize Exhibition held at Hakone, and received the Emilio Greco Special Excellence Award. In 1982, she received the 1st Teiichi Hijikata Memorial Prize for UTSUROI at the 8th Kobe Suma Palace Park Contemporary Sculpture Exhibition, and in 1986, he received the Governor of Tokyo Award for the Utsurohi series at the 2nd Tokyo Outdoor Contemporary Sculpture Exhibition.

In 1985, Miyawaki held a solo exhibition at Julien Cornick Gallery in Paris. This exhibition led to the installation of Utsurohi in the square near the Grande Arche in the La Défense district, which was completed in 1989. In 1990, Utsurohi was installed in the square in front of the Sant Jordi Sports Palace, which was designed by Isozaki for the Barcelona Olympics in 1992. In 1994, together with Shūsaku Arakawa and Kazuro Okazaki, Miyawaki installed the work at the Isozaki-designed Nagi Museum of Contemporary Art in Okayama.

=== Late 1990s–2014 ===
In 1997, Miyawaki fell ill, but she did not cease making art. In 1998, for a solo exhibition at the Museum of Modern Art, Kanagawa, the artist produced and exhibited a newly created series of ink drawings based on Utsurohi. Miyawaki was awarded for her innovation in Japanese contemporary art from the Japan Arts Foundation and in 2003, received L'Ordre des Arts et des Lettres from the French Ministry of Culture.

Miyawaki died on 20 August 2014 of pancreatic cancer at a hospital in Aoba-ku, Yokohama. She was 84 years old.

=== Legacy ===
In 2017 retrospective exhibition of Miyawaki's work was held at the Museum Haus Kasuya. In 2023 her work was included in the exhibition Action, Gesture, Paint: Women Artists and Global Abstraction 1940-1970 at the Whitechapel Gallery in London.

== Utsurohi installation sites ==
- Gunma Museum of Modern Art, Takasaki
- Sapporo Sculpture Garden, Hokkaido
- South Coast Plaza, Costa Mesa, California
- Princeton Mobil Oil Research Center
- Leon Pierre Boulez Square, Siena Park, Colorado
- Houston Pitman Sculpture Garden
- La Défense, Paris
- Sant Jordi Sports Palace Square, Barcelona
- Nagi Museum of Contemporary Art, Okayama
- Main Forum, Frankfurt

== Museum & gallery collections ==
- Hara Museum of Contemporary Art (museum permanently closed in 2021)
- Nagi Museum of Contemporary Art, Okayama
- Museum Haus Kasuya
- Bohemian's Gallery
- Toki-no-Wasuremono
