= Nagi Museum of Contemporary Art =

Contemporary art museum in Okayama, Japan

Coordinates: 35.1239°N 134.1749°E

Nagi Museum Of Contemporary Art
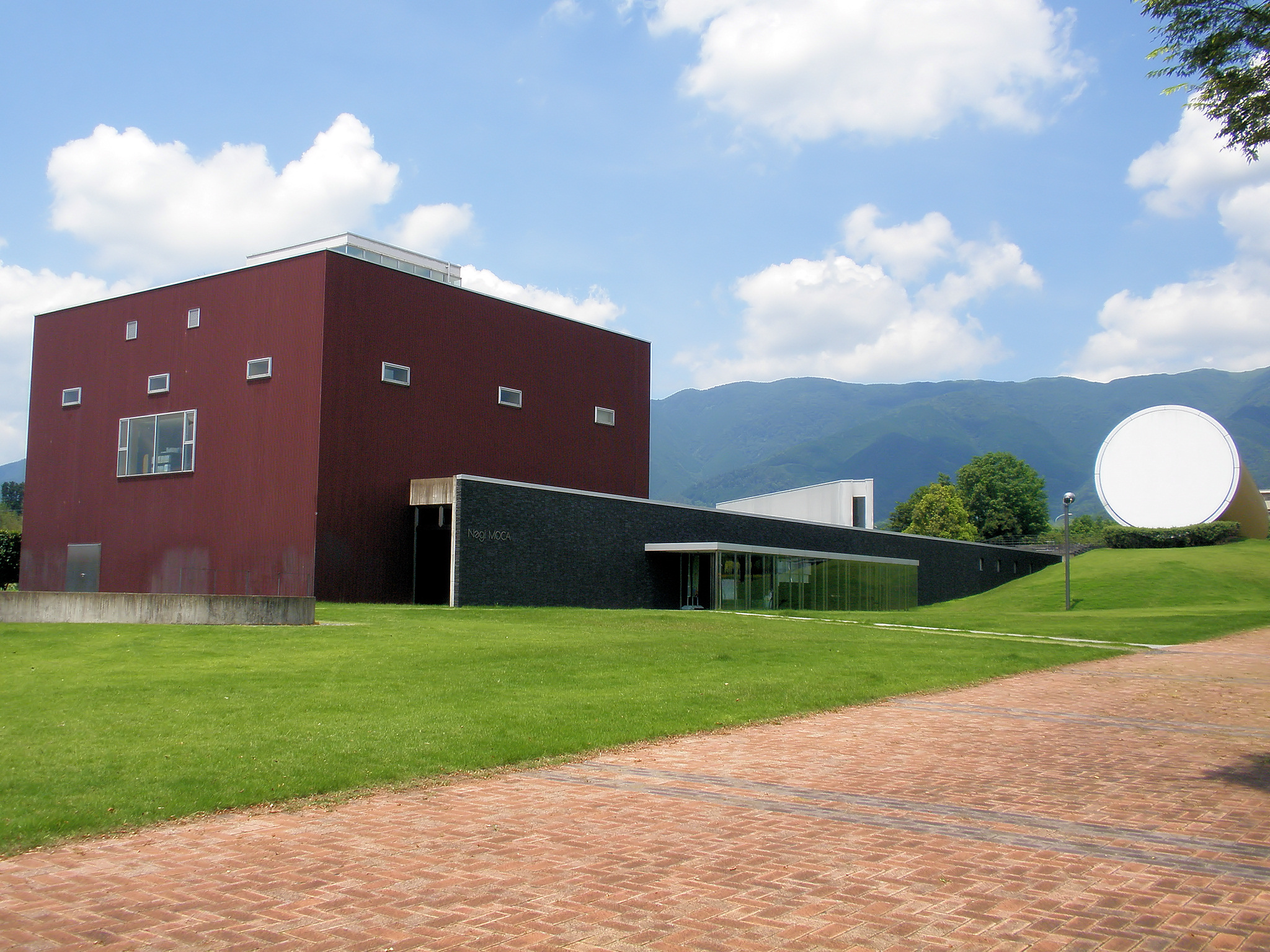
- Established: April 25, 1994
- Location: Nagi, Okayama, Japan
- Type: Contemporary art museum
- Website: www.town.nagi.okayama.jp/moca/

The Nagi Museum of Contemporary Art (Nagi MOCA) (奈義町現代美術館, Nagi-chō Gendai Bijutsukan) is a museum in Nagi, Okayama, Japan. It was jointly created by architect Arata Isozaki and artists whose works are displayed.

== Exhibited works ==
The site features permanent installations.

- Shusaku Arakawa + Madeline Gins, Ubiquitous Site * Nagi’s Ryoanji * Architectural Body
- Kazuo Okazaki, Hisashi
- Aiko Miyawaki, Utsurohi

== See also ==
- Reversible destiny
