= Reversible Destiny Foundation =

- Industry: Art/Science/Architecture
- Founded: 1987
- Founder: Shusaku Arakawa and Madeline Gins
- Headquarters: New York, USA
- Website: http://www.reversibledestiny.org

The Reversible Destiny Foundation is a nonprofit organization founded by artists Madeline Gins and Shusaku Arakawa in 2010. The Foundation was created to promote Gins and Arakawa's respective work and philosophy in art, architecture, and writing. It is headquartered in Brooklyn, New York.

== History and philosophy ==
In 1963, Shusaku Arakawa and Madeline Gins began collaborating on art and architectural projects, producing a work called "The Mechanism of Meaning" that was published as a book in 1971. In 1987, as a means of financing the design and construction of works of procedural architecture that would draw on The Mechanism of Meaning, Arakawa and Gins founded the Architectural Body Research Foundation. The Reversible Destiny Foundation was formed in 2010.

=== Key ideas and terminology ===
Architectural body

An architectural body is a unit of measurement: the Human Body + Its Immediate Surroundings. Contrasted to conventional notions of the body that purport clear boundaries, the architectural body holds that boundaries can only be suggested. From the term 'architectural body,' three hypotheses arise:

- Architectural body hypothesis or sited awareness hypothesis: What stems from the body, by way of awareness, should be held to be of it. Any site at which a person deems an X to exist should be considered a contributing segment of her awareness.
- Insufficiently procedural bioscleave hypothesis: It is because we are creatures of an insufficiently procedural bioscleave that the human lot remains untenable.
- Closely argued built-discourse: Adding carefully sequenced sets of architectural procedures (closely argued ones) to bioscleave will, by making it more procedurally sufficient, reconfigure supposed inevitability.

Organism that persons

The phrase 'organism that persons' describes the impressions an organism expresses, and thereby resulting in the organism being the type of organism it is. As an ontological phenomenon, it is manifested in all organisms; for example, a dog is an organism that dogs and a cat is an organism that cats.

Procedural architecture

Procedural architecture is defined in Architectural Body (2002). Understanding procedural architecture is clarified by the notion of procedural knowing, i.e. the reduction of steps necessary to complete a routine, and making those steps a subroutine of that procedure. Walking, talking, and eating are examples of procedural knowing.

Procedural architecture brings into question an occupant’s procedures and steers her to minutely examine the actions, or subroutines, she takes, thereby causing her to doubt herself long enough to find a way to reinvent herself.

== Completed projects ==
Bioscleave House (Lifespan Extending Villa)
(East Hampton, New York, 2000–2008)

The Bioscleave House is the first architectural project that the Reversible Destiny Foundation completed in the United States. Its construction spanned almost a decade, encountering obstacles from its initial funder, and ultimately cost over two million dollars. The house has four rooms, a free-form living space and walls made of various materials, such as metal and translucent polycarbonate. There are no internal doors. The room has levels and makes the visitor feel like they are in two places at once. That violates the idea of what a room should be, and by changing the idea of how architecture should work, people may be changing their ideas about how life should work. The Bioscleave House draws its name from the way a body holds, or cleaves, to these surroundings.

Reversible Destiny Houses – Mitaka
(Mitaka, Tokyo, Japan Completed October 2005)

The Reversible Destiny Lofts – Mitaka (In Memory of Helen Keller) is a nine-unit multiple dwelling. It was first completed as an example of procedural architecture put to residential use. These lofts reflexively articulate the residents’ operative tendencies and coordinating skills essential to and determinative of human thought and behavior; which means to say, the lofts manage, by virtue of how they are constructed, to reveal to their residents the ins and outs of what makes a person, in this case the resident. This is the same set of tendencies and skills to which Arakawa and Madeline Gins gave diagrammatic form in their decades-long research project The Mechanism of Meaning.

Built by Takenaka Corp., a leading Japanese contractor, the apartments meet every building-code requirement. Through its construction, the Reversible Destiny Lofts – Mitaka (In Memory of Helen Keller) invite optimistic and constructive action to help residents live long and ample lives.

Site of Reversible Destiny – Yoro
(Yoro, Gifu Prefecture, Japan, 1993–1995)

Opened in October 1995, the Site of Reversible Destiny - Yoro Park is an "experience park" conceived on the theme of encountering the unexpected. By guiding visitors through various unexpected experiences as they walk through its component areas, the site offers them opportunities to rethink their physical and spiritual orientation to the world. The site consists of a main pavilion, the Critical Resemblance House, the Elliptical Field and the Reversible Destiny Office.

The Critical Resemblance House has a roof that is shaped as a map of Gifu Prefecture, offering visitors a range of perceptual and cognitive experiences. The interior, a maze-like configuration that can be entered and exited at numerous points, has household furniture―sofas, beds, kitchen sinks―arranged in corresponding pairs on the floor, under the floor, and on the ceiling.

The Elliptical Field, which is a large, bowl-shaped basin, consists of nine pavilions (each a reproduction of a segment of the Critical Resemblance House), an array of complementary mounds and hollows, five maps of varying sizes of the Japanese archipelago, and, weaving in between all of these, an intricate network of 148 paths. The largest of the Japan maps, which extends across the entire Field, is planted with 24 species of medicinal herbs that give it a gradually changing complexion from season to season.

The Reversible Destiny Office was added in April 1997. It houses information about the site, Arakawa's drawings and other works, and screens a documentary about the site's construction.

Ubiquitous Site * Nagi’s Ryoanji * Architectural Body
(Nagi Museum Of Contemporary Art, Japan 1994)

The small entrance room, the stairway, and the cylindrical room present an exercise in perception and physical experience. The balance between self-consciousness and perception of one's body is broken down, the "axis" shifts, consciousness leans out, is "doubled," and "something" emerges. This "something" existed in the perceptions of the newborn child that has been forgotten in growing up. People's roots are found in what might be described as "insecurity," "faith," or "heart." It might be called "nostalgia," a certain "atmosphere." The artists speak of artificially creating "instant nostalgia." It is artificially constructed, using something "given," breaking through the logjam of words found in modern thought. They conduct experiments which deal more with the possibilities of physical structures and the human body than of words. It is up to the viewer to determine what is made to happen or actually happens here, and what can be gained from it.

== Works in progress ==
Healing Fun House at BOOM: Palm Springs Desert Community

== Books by Arakawa and Gins ==
- Word Rain (Gins, 1969)
- The Mechanism of Meaning (Arakawa & Gins, 1971) Minneapolis Institute of Arts, [©1979].
- Intend (Gins, 1973) OCLC 84508444
- What the President Will Say and Do (Gins, 1984) Barrytown, N.Y. : Station Hill, ©1984 ISBN 9780930794934
- To Not to Die [poetry] (Gins, 1987), Tōkyō : Riburo Pōto, 1988 ISBN 9784845703326
- Architecture: Sites of Reversible Destiny (Arakawa & Gins, 1994) London : Academy Editions, 1994 ISBN 9781854902795
- Helen Keller or Arakawa (Gins, 1994) (originally published as ヘレン・ケラーまたは荒川修作 / Heren kera matawa arakawa shusaku)
- Helen Keller ou Arakawa. Portrait de l'artiste en jeune aveugle (Gins, trans. Marie D Garnier, Hermann 2016)
- Reversible Destiny (Arakawa & Gins, 1997) New York (NY) : Guggenheim Museum, 1997. ISBN 9780810969025
- Architectural Body (Arakawa & Gins, 2002) Tuscaloosa : University of Alabama Press, ©2002. ISBN 9780817311681
- Making Dying Illegal (Arakawa & Gins, 2006) New York : Roof Books, ©2006. ISBN 9781931824224

== Films ==
- Why Not (A Serenade of Eschatological Ecology) (1969)
- For Example (A Critique of Never) (1971)
