= Lucy Ives =

American novelist, poet, and critic (born January 10, 1980)

- Born: 1980 (age 45–46); New York City, U.S.
- Education: Harvard University (BA); Iowa Writers' Workshop (MFA); New York University (PhD)
- Occupations: Novelist; poet; critic
- Website: www.lucy-ives.com

Lucy Ives (born 1980) is an American novelist, poet, and critic.

Born in New York City, Ives graduated from Harvard University with a BA and from the Iowa Writers' Workshop with an MFA. Ives earned her PhD in comparative literature from New York University.

Ives's long poem Anamnesis (2009) won the Slope Editions Book Prize. In 2013 Ives published a novella, Nineties, her second novella, The Worldkillers, was published in 2014. Orange Roses, a collection of essays and poetry, was published in 2013. Ives's novel Impossible Views of the World (2017) was chosen as a New York Times Editors' Choice and published by Penguin. Her second novel, Loudermilk: Or, The Real Poet; Or, The Origin of the World, was published by Soft Skull Press in 2019. Her first story collection, Cosmogony, was published by Soft Skull Press in 2021. Graywolf Press is her current publisher.

Ives has been the recipient of an Iowa Arts fellowship, a MacCracken fellowship, a Creative Capital | Andy Warhol Foundation Arts Writers Grant, the Vermont Book Award in Creative Nonfiction, and a 2026 Guggenheim Fellowship.

== Bibliography ==
- Anamnesis (2009)
- Nineties (2013)
- Orange Roses (2013)
- The Worldkillers (2014)
- The Hermit (2016)
- Impossible Views of the World (2017)
- Loudermilk: Or, The Real Poet; Or, The Origin of the World (2019)
- Cosmogony (2021)
- Life Is Everywhere (2022)
- An Image of My Name Enters America (2024)

As editor

- The Saddest Thing Is That I Have Had to Use Words: A Madeline Gins Reader (2020)
