= Madeline Gins =

American artist, architect, and poet (1941–2014)

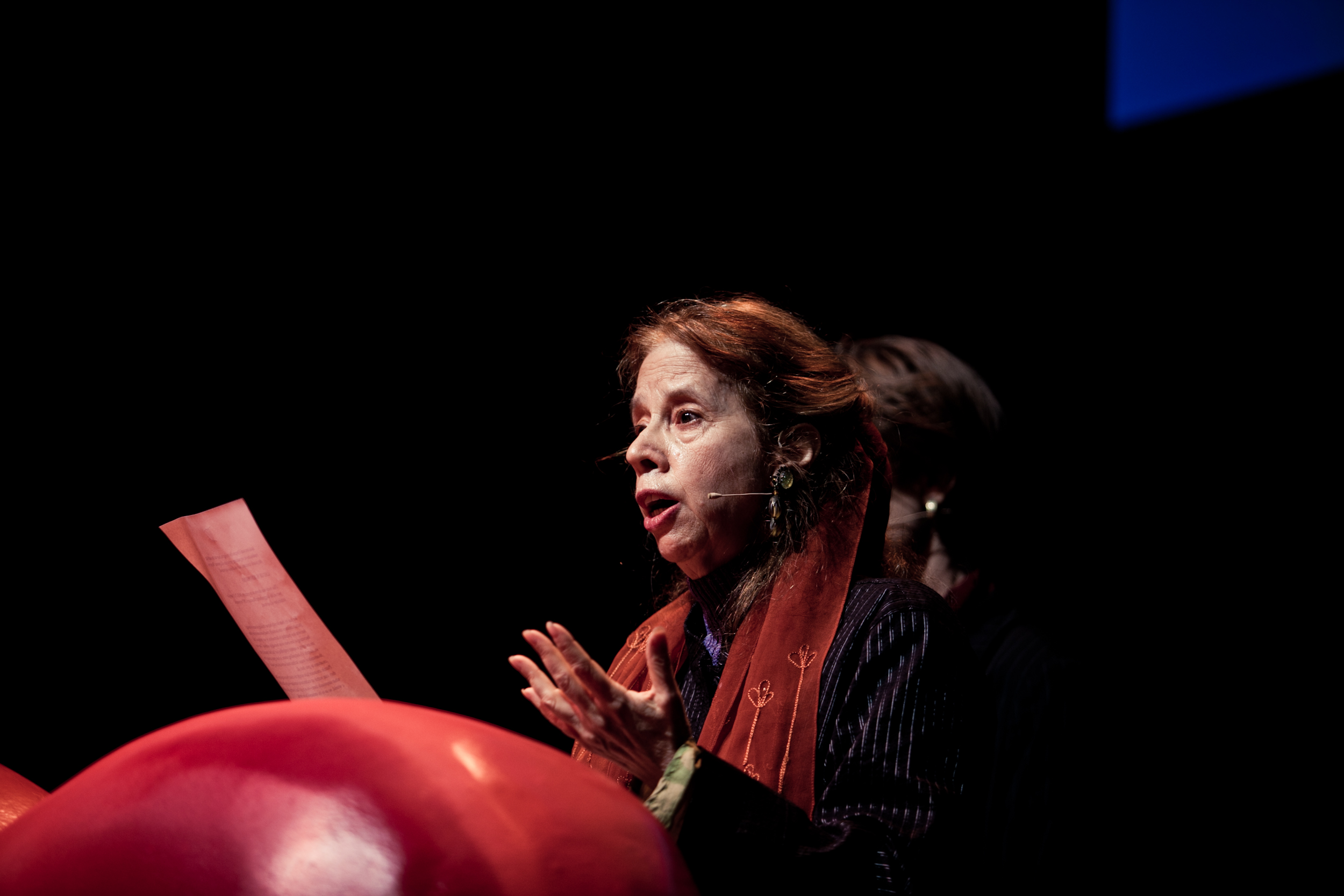
- Madeline Gins in 2009
- Born: Madeline Helen Gins; November 7, 1941; New York City, U.S.
- Died: January 8, 2014 (aged 72); New York City, U.S.
- Education: Barnard College
- Known for: Artist, architect, poet
- Spouse: Shusaku Arakawa
- Website: www.reversibledestiny.org

Madeline Helen Arakawa Gins (November 7, 1941 – January 8, 2014) was an American artist, architect, and poet.

== Early life and education ==
Gins was born in New York City, November 7, 1941, and raised on Long Island, in the village of Island Park. She studied physics and Eastern philosophy at Barnard College.

== Career ==
Gins met her partner and husband, artist Shusaku Arakawa, in 1963, while studying painting at the Brooklyn Museum Art School. One of their earlier collaborations, "The Mechanism of Meaning", was shown in its entirety at the 1997 Guggenheim exhibition, Arakawa/Gins – Reversible Destiny/We Have Decided Not to Die.

In 1987, as a means of financing the design and construction of works of architecture (that draw on The Mechanism of Meaning), Arakawa and Gins founded the Reversible Destiny Foundation. The Foundation actively collaborates with practitioners in a wide range of disciplines including, experimental biology, neuroscience, quantum physics, experimental phenomenology, and medicine. Their architectural projects included residences (Bioscleave House (Lifespan Extending Villa), Reversible Destiny Lofts (In memory of Helen Keller) – Mitaka, Tokyo, Japan), parks (Site of Reversible Destiny-Yoro) and plans for housing complexes and neighborhoods (Reversible Destiny Fun House, BOOM-LGBT Community, Isle of Reversible Destiny-Venice and Isle of Reversible Destiny-Fukuoka, Sensorium City, Tokyo).

She and Arakawa "lost their life savings" to the Bernie Madoff Ponzi scheme.

Arakawa and Gins cofounded the Reversible Destiny Foundation, an organization dedicated to the use of architecture to extend the human lifespan. They co-authored books, including Reversible Destiny, the catalogue of their Guggenheim exhibition, Architectural Body (University of Alabama Press, 2002), and Making Dying Illegal (New York: Roof Books, 2006). They also designed and built residences and parks, including the Reversible Destiny Lofts, Bioscleave House, and the Site of Reversible Destiny–Yoro.

== Death ==
On March 18, 2010, Arakawa died, after a week of hospitalization. Gins would not state the cause of death. "This mortality thing is bad news," she stated. She planned to redouble efforts to prove "aging can be outlawed."

On January 8, 2014, Gins died of cancer at age 72.

== Architectural works by Arakawa and Gins ==
- "UBIQUITOUS SITE, NAGI'S RYOANJI, Architectural Body (Nagi, Okayama, Japan, 1994, Nagi Museum Of Contemporary Art)
- "Site of Reversible Destiny – Yoro Park (Yōrō, Gifu, Japan, 1995)
- "Shidami Resource Recycling Model House (Nagoya, Japan, 2005)
- "the Reversible Destiny Lofts MITAKA – In Memory of Helen Keller (Mitaka, Tokyo, Japan 2005)
- "Bioscleave house – LIFESPAN EXTENDING VILLA (Northwest Harbor, East Hampton, Long Island, NY, 2008)
- "Biotopological Scale-Juggling Escalator (NYC, 2013/Dover Street Market, New York, NY, Comme des Garçons)

== Publications ==
=== Books by Madeline Gins ===
- The Saddest Thing Is That I Have Had to Use Words. Edited by Lucy Ives. Catskill, NY: Siglio Press, 2020. ISBN 978-1-938221-24-8
- Helen Keller or Arakawa. Santa Fe, NM: Burning Books with East/West Cultural Studies, 1994. ISBN 978-0-936050-11-9
- Helen Keller ou Arakawa. Portrait de l'artiste en jeune aveugle., Paris, Hermann, 2017, trans. Marie-Dominique Garnier, pref. Jean-Michel Rabaté.
- What the President Will Say and Do!! Barrytown, NY: Station Hill Press, 1984. ISBN 0-930794-92-3
- Intend. Bologna: Tau/ma, 1973.
- Word Rain (or A Discursive Introduction to the Philosophical Investigation of G,R,E,T,A, G,A,R,B,O, It Says). New York: Grossman Publishers, 1969.

=== Books by Arakawa and Madeline Gins ===
- Making Dying Illegal, Architecture Against Death: Original to the 21st Century. New York: Roof Books, 2006 ISBN 978-1-931824-22-4; Tokyo: Shunjusha, 2007.
- Le Corps Architectural. Paris: Editions Manucius, 2005 ISBN 978-2-84578-049-1
- Architectural Body. Tuscaloosa, AL: University of Alabama Press, 2002 ISBN 978-0-8173-1168-1
- Reversible Destiny: Arakawa/Gins. New York: Guggenheim Museum Publications, 1997 (hardcover distributed by Harry N. Abrams). Catalogue of the exhibition at the Guggenheim Museum SoHo, June 25–August 31, 1997. ISBN 0-8109-6902-5 (hardcover); ISBN 0-89207-188-5 (softcover).
- ARCHITECTURE: Sites of Reversible Destiny: Architectural Experiments after Auschwitz-Hiroshima. London: Academy Editions, 1994. ISBN 1-85490-279-2
- Pour ne pas mourir. To Not To Die. Paris: Editions de la différence, 1987. ISBN 2-7291-0250-7
- Mechanismus der Bedeutung. The Mechanism of Meaning. Introduction by Lawrence Alloway. Munich: Bruckmann, 1971 ISBN 3-7654-1439-5; New York: Harry N. Abrams, Inc., 1979, 2nd edition ISBN 0-8109-0667-8; New York: Abbeville Press, 1988, 3rd edition. ISBN 0-89659-809-8
- For Example (A Critique of Never). Milan: Alessandra Castelli Press, 1974.

=== Essays by Gins ===
- '"The Architectural Body – Landing Sites" (in collaboration with Arakawa), Space in America: Theory History Culture (eds Benesch, Klaus; Schmidt, Kerstein; Fall 2005) ISBN 978-0-8173-1169-8
- '"LIVING BODY Museum", Cities Without Citizens (2003), pp. 243–57 ISBN 978-0-9714848-4-9
- '"Gifu-Reversible Destiny" (in collaboration with Arakawa), Architectural Design, Games of Architecture (1996), pp. 27–35
- '"Housing Complexity" (in collaboration with Arakawa), Journal of Philosophy and the Visual Arts, No. 6 (1995), pp. 88–95
- '"Landing Sites/The End of Spacetime" (in collaboration with Arakawa), Art and Design (May–June 1993)
- '"Person as Site in Respect to a Tentative Constructed Plan" (in collaboration with Arakawa). ANYWHERE (1992), pp. 54–67
- The Tentative Constructed Plan as Intervening Device for a Reversible Destiny (in collaboration with Arakawa) A+U: Architecture and Urbanism (December 1991), pp. 48–57.
- '"The Process in Question," Critical Relations. Highgate Art Trust, (editor) Joan Burns, Williamstown, Massachusetts (1989)
- '"To Return To!" (in collaboration with Arakawa), Marcel Duchamp and the Avant-Garde Since 1950. Köln: Ludwig Museum (1988)
- 'Essay on Multi-Dimensional Architecture" (selections published in Boundary 2, Fall 1985/Winter 1986, and Pratt Architectural Journal, Spring 1988)
- '"Forum: Arakawa's The Sharing of Nameless, 1982–83," DRAWING, Jan.-Feb. 1985, pp. 103–04
