= Shunzō Miyawaki =

Japanese railway travel writer (1926–2003)

- 宮脇 俊三
- Born: December 9, 1926; Kawagoe, Saitama, Japan
- Died: February 26, 2003 (aged 76); Toranomon, Minato, Tokyo, Japan
- Occupations: Author; editor
- Spouse: Aiko Miyawaki (m. 1951; div. 1965)
- Writing career
- Genre: Travel literature

Shunzō Miyawaki (宮脇 俊三, Miyawaki Shunzō; December 9, 1926 – February 26, 2003) was a Japanese travel writer and editor. He wrote over 40 books in his lifetime, mostly focused on rail transport in Japan and overseas. He was the recipient of the 47th Kikuchi Kan Prize in 1999 for "establishing railway travelogues as a genre of literature".

== Career and works ==
=== Editor ===
Miyawaki was raised in Shibuya, Tokyo. After graduating from the Department of Western History at the University of Tokyo Faculty of Letters, he joined the publisher Chuokoron-Shinsha as an editor. He eventually went on to serve as both editor-in-chief and managing director of the company, and helped launch the career of novelist Morio Kita.

=== Travel writer ===
His first book was published by Kawade Shobō Shinsha on July 10, 1978, titled Jikokuhyō 2-man Kiro (時刻表2万キロ; lit. '20,000 Kilometers of Timetables'), chronicling his journey of riding all lines of the Japanese National Railways. Upon publication, he resigned from his position at Chuokoron-Shinsha. The book became a bestseller, led to widespread recognition in Japan of "riding trains" as a hobby in and of itself, and helped established "railway travel literature" as a non-fiction literary genre in Japan.

The following year, he published his second travelogue via Shinchosha, Saichō Katamichi Kippu no Tabi (最長片道切符の旅; lit. 'The Longest One-Way Ticket Journey'). His future works were published by various companies, including JTB, Bungeishunjū, Kodansha, Kadokawa Shoten, and others.

Miyawaki's other notable works include Jikokuhyō Shōwa-shi (時刻表昭和史; lit. 'Shōwa History of Timetables'), published 1980, and Tabi no Owari wa Koshitsu Shindaisha (旅の終りは個室寝台車; lit. 'The Journey Ends with a Private Sleeper Car'), published 1984. His 1985 mystery novel Satsui no Fūkei (殺意の風景; lit. 'Landscape of Murderous Intent') was awarded the 13th Izumi Kyōka Prize for Literature. He also wrote short stories, essays, and historical novels.

== Death ==
Miyawaki died of pneumonia in 2003, at age 76.
