= Shusaku Arakawa =

Japanese artist and architect

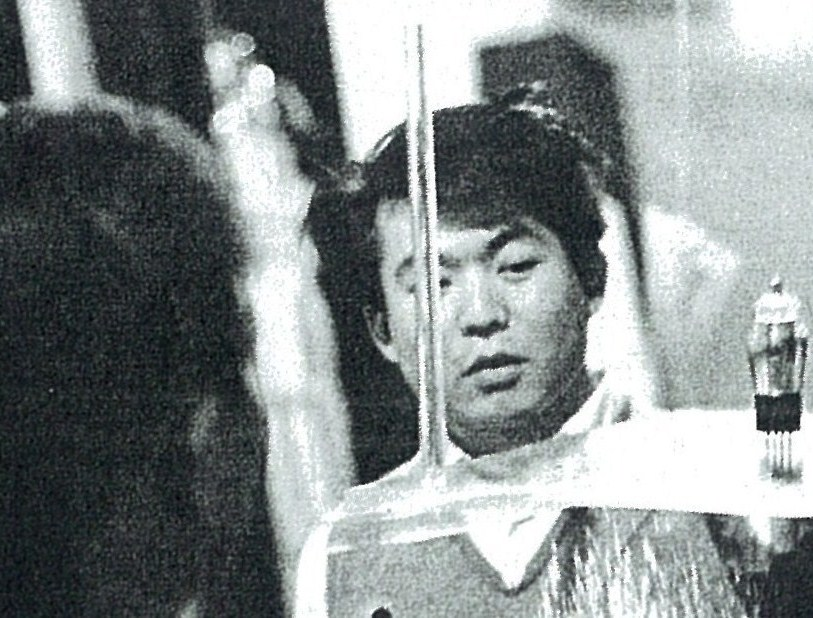
- Arakawa in 1963
- Born: July 6, 1936; Nagoya, Japan
- Died: May 19, 2010 (aged 73); New York City, New York, U.S.
- Education: University of Tokyo (Mathematics and Medicine) Musashino Art University (Art)
- Occupation: Artist/Architect
- Known for: The Mechanism of Meaning Reversible Destiny
- Movement: Neo-Dadaism, Conceptualism
- Spouse: Madeline Gins
- Website: www.reversibledestiny.org

Shūsaku Arakawa (荒川 修作, Arakawa Shūsaku; July 6, 1936 – May 19, 2010) was a Japanese conceptual artist and architect. He had a personal and artistic partnership with the writer and artist Madeline Gins that spanned more than four decades in which they collaborated on a diverse range of visual mediums, including: painting & printmaking, experimental filmmaking, performance art, and architectural & landscape design.

Throughout his life, Arakawa frequently infused his works with philosophical ideas that considered art's intrinsic functions, human perceptions of the physical world, and the language of signs, symbols, and visual meanings. These thematic elements were based on the writings and theories authored by key figures in Science, Philosophy, and Art History: Leonardo da Vinci, Albert Einstein, and Ludwig Wittgenstein.

Beginning in the 1960s, Arakawa's work attracted positive responses from the Western art world and led to his representation at numerous esteemed galleries and museums: the Dwan Gallery, Gagosian, The National Museum of Modern Art, Centre Pompidou, David Barnett Gallery, The Metropolitan Museum of Art, and the Museum of Modern Art, New York.

Arakawa and Gins founded The Reversible Destiny Foundation in which they designed architectural sites that were aimed toward the longevity of human life expectancy. Moreover, they established the Architectural Body Research Foundation in 1987 as a non-profit research group that stimulated multidisciplinary studies with renowned biologists, neuroscientists, quantum physicists, and medical doctors on the nature of life and death.

Arakawa usually referred to himself by his surname only, which eventually came to be more commonly practiced by him during his career in the United States and Europe.

== Early life ==
Shusaku Arakawa was born in Nagoya on July 6, 1936. His family ran an udon shop. Arakawa spoke of himself as an "eternal outsider" and "abstractionist of the future", and was interested in a variety of disciplines including art, mathematics, and medicine. The convergence of his interests in multiple, seemingly disparate subjects originated during childhood. One of Arakawa's neighbors was a doctor who offered the young Arakawa professional advice on proper training for a career in medicine. According to Arakawa, the doctor's wife, an artist, advised him to "draw" which led him to refine his skills in both drawing and painting.

Arakawa briefly attended Musashino Art University to study art.

== Early career (1950s – 1960s) ==
Arakawa's early works were first displayed in the infamous Yomiuri Indépendant Exhibition in 1958, a watershed event for postwar Japanese avant-garde art that departed from the strictness of traditional Japanese art exhibitions in favor of a looser structure with an absence of awards and a deciding jury. During this exhibition, Arakawa produced a socio-political installation that criticized the 1945 atomic bombings at Hiroshima and Nagasaki; coffin-like boxes contained lumps of cement with fur and hair attached to recall the violence inflicted upon Japanese citizens by the American military. The utilization of objets – everyday, consumer products transformed into assemblages – permitted Arakawa to convey meaning through items not traditionally associated with the fine arts.

In 1960, at the height of the massive Anpo protests against the U.S.-Japan Security Treaty, Arakawa became involved with the avant-garde art collective Neo-Dada Organizers, along with Genpei Akasegawa, Ushio Shinohara, Shō Kazakura, Kinpei Masuzawa, and group founder Masanobu Yoshimura. The group engaged in a series of bizarre "events" and "happenings" that blended visual and performance art, which the art critic Yoshiaki Tōno labeled "anti-art" (han-geijutsu) and the critic Hariu Ichirō deemed "savagely meaningless".

One of Arakawa's stunts as a member of Neo-Dada was a work titled Site Made by the Viewer performed at Nihon University, in which Arakawa invited 400 spectators to an auditorium but refused to allow them inside. When Yoshimura and five other attendees, at Arakawa's urging, climbed a ladder that led up to the auditorium's balcony, Arakawa removed the ladder, trapping them on the balcony for over one hour while he silently crouched in the darkness. Arakawa explained he did not create an artwork but "manipulated" his audience by turning them into "actors".

Arakawa was eventually expelled from the Neo-Dada Organizers collective because he was deemed "too much of an aesthete", and for chaotically disrupting group events.

== Paintings and printmaking (1960s – 2010) ==
Arakawa arrived in New York in 1961 with fourteen dollars in his pocket and a telephone number for Marcel Duchamp, whom he phoned from the airport and with whom he eventually formed a close friendship. Inspired by Duchamp's conceptual approach to artistic production, he began to integrate diagrams within his paintings as philosophical propositions to compel viewers to question the representation of forms and to assess how the diagrams affected one's perception. He referred to them as "diagrams of the mind". Arakawa's diagrammatic paintings often included text intermixed with charts, arrows, and scales. Moreover, an eclectic range of cultural and historical figures informed Arakawa's artistic engagement with philosophy, including Leonardo da Vinci, Albert Einstein, and Ludwig Wittgenstein. Thematically, these works are enmeshed with theoretical ideas grounded in phenomenology, physics, metaphysics, semiotics, and epistemology.

In terms of meaning, these works were endowed with complex messages that interrogated the precise nature of art's function and how art is meant to be perceived. Hard or Soft No. 3 (1969) is a painting in which numbers, letters, arrows, and lines are sparsely positioned from one another among large expanses of white negative space, and the following text frames the bottom tier of the work: "These arrows indicate almost nothing/Re-arrange the numbers anyway you like." Paintings like Hard or Soft No. 3 were meant to stimulate critical thinking among viewers to discern how language can be constructed from basic visual elements (line, shape, color, form, etc.).

During The Mechanism of Meaning exhibition at the Guggenheim in 1997, art critic Roberta Smith described Arakawa's paintings and prints as "a bridge between Dada and Fluxus and the soon-to-be-Conceptual Art" and added that they operate as "philosophical or linguistic puzzles" that are open to countless interpretations and visual readings. Moreover, art historians, critics, and curators note that the diagrammatic, blueprint-like appearances of Arakawa's paintings and prints foreshadow his and Gins's later architectural projects.

The versatility of Arakawa's printmaking abilities is evident in the range of printing techniques he pursued: silkscreen, lithography, embossing, etching, and aquatint.

== Film (1960s – 1970s) ==
Arakawa's partnership with Gins led to their creation of films in the late-1960s and early-1970s that further expounded upon the philosophical ideas Arakawa explored in his paintings and prints. Although it comprised a short segment of his career, his involvement in experimental filmmaking was another avenue through which he could question and alter viewers' understanding of perception, evident in his philosophically laden Why Not: A Serenade of Eschatological Ecology (1969).

For Example (1971) features a young homeless boy who wanders the streets of New York City in a drunken stupor while a male narrator recites a text. The film's documentary-style camerawork was intended to visualize and articulate the theories espoused in Arakawa and Gins's long-term architectural project The Mechanism of Meaning, which specifically aims to "deconstruct meaning and construct non-meaning".

== The Mechanism of Meaning (1960s – 1980s) ==
Beginning in 1963, he collaborated with fellow artist, architect, and poet Madeline Gins on the research project The Mechanism of Meaning, which was completed by 1973. This research project and its subsequent architectural projects – both built and unbuilt ones – formed the basis of the 1997 Arakawa + Gins: Reversible Destiny exhibition at the Guggenheim Museum SoHo (the accompanying book of the same title remains the most comprehensive collection of their work, and it incorporates the whole of the Arakawa/Gins book, The Mechanism of Meaning).

The panels appear as a constellation of views concerning the nature of meaning that may be characterized as "holistic" or as entailments of a holistic view concerning meaning. To date, two editions of The Mechanism of Meaning have been made and many of the panels fuse collaged elements.

In the years since Arakawa's and Gins's deaths, there has been a legal dispute regarding ownership of The Mechanism of Meaning between the Architectural Body Research Foundation and the Reversible Destiny Foundation.

== Reversible Destiny Foundation (1980s – 2010) ==
Arakawa and Madeline Gins co-founded the Reversible Destiny Foundation in 2010, an organization dedicated to the use of architecture to extend the human lifespan. They have co-authored books, including Reversible Destiny, which is the catalogue of their Guggenheim exhibition, Architectural Body (University of Alabama Press, 2002) and Making Dying Illegal (New York: Roof Books, 2006), and have designed and built residences and parks, including the Reversible Destiny Lofts-Mitaka (In Memory of Helen Keller), Bioscleave House (Lifespan Extending Villa), and the Site of Reversible Destiny-Yoro.

Designed in 1995, "The Site of Reversible Destiny - Yoro Park" was conceived as an "experience park" to reorient and transform visitors' understanding of their bodily relationship to the physical world. Flat, planar surface were removed entirely from the park, and instead Arakawa and Gins placed great emphasis on hilly, bulging surfaces that complicated how one walked around the park; spectators were encouraged to interact with the site as if they were toddlers learning to walk for the first time.

Bioslceave House (Lifespan Extending Villa) (2000–2008) in East Hampton, New York encapsulates the philosophies Arakawa and Gins shared toward human mortality. The house's form is characterized by its asymmetrical, undulating appearance whose interior and exterior walls are each painted in over four dozen shades of vibrant hues. Ceilings and entranceways extend across varying directions and heights, either along straightened or curved edges. Similarly, windows and light switches are strewn along the walls at inconsistent heights. The floors are designed from hardened soil with rounded bumps atop their surfaces that slope at both slight and steep inclines; freestanding poles are included in multiple rooms to assist occupants to maintain their physical balance. Arakawa and Gins firmly believed it was integral for domestic environments to be constructed in layouts that rendered residents with a sense of instability and discomfort. They argued physical passivity and comfort allows the human body to deteriorate and the solution to reverse one's mortality is to reside in a home that encourages continual bodily movement and reorientation, which is evident in the Bioscleave House's lack of smooth floors and high/low placement of windows.

"The Reversible Destiny Lofts - Mitaka (In Memory of Helen Keller)" were completed in Tokyo's western suburbs in 2005. Similar to Bioscleave, the lofts employed the philosophy of "procedural architecture" whereby the human body is kept in a continual state of physical interaction with their surrounding environment to prevent age-related decline. In terms of formal arrangement, each of the lofts are assembled together in cubical, spherical, and tubular shapes that each contain spatially disparate layouts for their respective residences. While Bioscleave was more focused on residential functions, the Mitaka Lofts are regularly utilized in a multipurpose fashion: residences, educational facilities, and cultural centers. Sections of the site are often leased for short and long-term usage, and it has even been a featured site on the popular vacation rental platform airbnb.

== Later life ==
Arakawa and Gins "lost their life savings" in the Bernie Madoff Ponzi Scheme.

== Death ==
Arakawa died on May 19, 2010, after a week of hospitalization. Gins would not state the cause of death. "This mortality thing is bad news", she stated. She planned to redouble efforts to prove "aging can be outlawed."

== Reception ==
Internationally renowned 20th-century philosophers studied the metaphysical underpinnings behind Arakawa's artworks and valued his synthesis of philosophical theories into a visual medium. The French philosopher Jean-Francois Lyotard praised Arakawa's work for its ability to "makes us think through the eyes", and the German philosopher Hans-Georg Gadamer commended Arakawa for his transformation of "the usual constancies of orientation into a strange, enticing game – a game of continually thinking out." Gadamer included a quote by the German poet Paul Celan to further underscore his comments: "There are songs to sing beyond the human."

The writer Charles Bernstein and artist Susan Bee observe, "Arakawa deals with the visual field as discourse, modal systems that constitute the world rather than being constituted by it." The art critic and philosopher Arthur Danto found Arakawa to be "a genuinely advanced artist" whose accolades he equated to Gins's literary prowess. For his part, Arakawa declared: "Painting is only an exercise, never more than that."

== Architectural works by Arakawa and Gins ==
- "Ubiquitous Site, Nagi's Ryoanji, Architectural Body (Nagi, Okayama, 1994 / Nagi Museum Of Contemporary Art)
- "The Site of Reversible Destiny-Yoro (Yōrō, Gifu, 1995)
- "Reversible Destiny Office," in "The Site of Reversible Destiny-Yoro" (Yōrō, Gifu, 1997)
- "Shidami Resource Recycling Model House (Nagoya, 2005)
- "The Reversible Destiny Lofts - Mitaka" (In Memory of Helen Keller) (Mitaka, Tokyo 2005)
- "Bioscleave House (Lifespan Extending Villa) (Northwest Harbor, East Hampton, Long Island, NY, 2008)
- "Biotopological Scale-Juggling Escalator (NY, 2013: / Dover Street Market New York, Comme des Garçons)

== Books by Arakawa and Gins ==
- Word Rain (Or a Discursive Introduction to the Philosophical Investigations of G,R,E,T,A, G,A,R,B,O, It Says) (Gins, 1969)
- The Mechanism of Meaning (Arakawa & Gins, 1971)
- Intend (Gins, 1973)
- What the President Will Say and Do!! (Gins, 1984)
- To Not to Die (Gins, 1987)
- Architecture: Sites of Reversible Destiny (Arakawa & Gins, 1994)
- Hellen Keller or Arakawa (Gins, 1994)
- Reversible Destiny (Arakawa & Gins, 1997)
- Architectural Body (Arakawa & Gins, 2002)
- Making Dying Illegal (Arakawa & Gins, 2006)
- For Example (A Critique of Never) (Arakawa, 1974)

== Filmography ==
- Why Not: A Serenade of Eschatological Ecology (1969)
- For Example (A Critique of Never) (1971)

== Exhibitions ==
Since the 1950s, Arakawa's artworks have been displayed in over four hundred exhibitions in Asia, North America, Europe, and Australia.

=== Selected solo exhibitions ===
- 1965: Peintures de Arakawa - Galerie Aujourd'hui, Palais des Beaux-Arts, Brussels, Belgium
- 1966: Arakawa - Stedelijk van Abbemuseum, Eindhoven, The Netherlands
- 1970: Shusaku Arakawa, Japanese Pavilion - XXXV Venice Biennale, Italy
- 1974: Arakawa: Recent Prints - The Museum of Modern Art, New York, USA
- 1979: Arakawa Prints - Williams College Museum of Art, Williamstown, Massachusetts, USA
- 1979: Arakawa: The Mechanism of Meaning - The National Museum of Art, Osaka, Japan
- 1982: Arakawa, Matrix 72 - Wadsworth Atheneum, Hartford, Connecticut, USA
- 1986: Arakawa: Paintings to Read - The Contemporary Art Gallery, Tokyo, Japan
- 1994: Arakawa: Drawings 1961 - 74 - Hara Museum of Contemporary Art, Tokyo, Japan
- 2006: Shusaku Arakawa: Print Works - Gifu Collection of Modern Arts, Gifu, Japan
- 2010: Funeral Bioengineering to Not to Die - Early Works by Arakawa Shusaku - The National Museum of Art, Osaka, Japan

=== Selected group exhibitions ===
- 1958: Tenth Yomiuri Indépendant Exhibition - Tokyo Metropolitan Art Museum, Tokyo, Japan
- 1959: Eleventh Yomiuri Indépendant Exhibition - Tokyo Metropolitan Art Museum, Tokyo, Japan
- 1960: Twelfth Yomiuri Indépendant Exhibition - Tokyo Metropolitan Art Museum, Tokyo, Japan
- 1961: Thirteenth Yomiuri Indépendant Exhibition - Tokyo Metropolitan Art Museum, Tokyo, Japan
- 1967: Drawing: Recent Acquisitions - The Museum of Modern Art, New York, USA
- 1967: Pictures to Be Read, Poetry to Be Seen - Museum of Contemporary Art, Chicago, Illinois, USA
- 1968: Pittsburgh International Exhibition of Contemporary Painting and Sculpture - Museum of Art Carnegie Institute, Pittsburgh, Pennsylvania, USA
- 1968: Documenta IV - Kassel, Germany
- 1970: Language IV - Dwan Gallery, New York, New York, USA
- 1976: The Golden Door: Artist-Immigrants of America 1876 - 1976 - Hirshhorn Museum and Sculpture Garden, Smithsonian Institution, Washington, D.C., USA
- 1976: Thirty Years of American Printmaking - Brooklyn Museum, New York, USA
- 1977: Documenta VI - Kassel, Germany
- 1983: Twentieth Century Acquisitions - The Metropolitan Museum of Art, New York, USA
- 2009: The Third Mind: American Artists Contemplate Asia, 1860 - 1989 - Guggenheim Museum, New York, USA
- 2019: American Masters 1940 - 1980 - National Gallery of Australia, Canberra, Australia

=== Select Arakawa and Gins exhibitions ===
- 1990: Building Sensoriums 1973 - 1990 - Ronald Feldman Fine Arts, New York, USA
- 1997: Reversible Destiny - Arakawa/Gins - Guggenheim Museum, New York, USA
- 2004: Arakawa + Gins: Architecture Against Death - Nagoya University of Arts, Art & Design Center, Nagoya, Japan
- 2010: Arakawa + Gins: Reversible Destiny Projects - Kyoto Institute of Technology Museum and Archives, Kyoto, Japan
- 2018: Arakawa and Madeline Gins: Eternal Gradient - Arthur Ross Architecture Gallery, Columbia University, New York

=== Retrospectives ===
- 2019: Arakawa: Diagrams for the Imagination - Gagosian, New York, USA

== Awards and recognition ==
Arakawa served as a representative of Japan in the XXXV Venice Biennale (1970), and was a participant in the German-based contemporary art exhibitions Documenta IV (1968) and Documenta VI (1977).

Additionally, Arakawa was the recipient of multiple awards and honors:

- 1986: Chevalier des Arts et des Lettres, French Government
- 1987 - 1988: John Simon Guggenheim Fellowship
- 1988 - 1989: Belgian Critics' Prize
- 1997: College Art Association's Artist Award for Exhibition of the Year/Distinguished Body of Work, Presentation or Performance Award
- 1998: Highest award in the Rainbow Town Urban Design Competition
- 2003: Shijo Housho - Medal with Purple Ribbon
- 2003: Nihon Gendai Shinko Sho - Award for Innovation in Japanese Contemporary Art from Japan Arts Foundation
- 2010: The Order of the Rising Sun - Gold Rays with Rosette
- 2021: Google celebrated his 85th birthday with a Google Doodle.

== Collections ==
In addition to private and corporate collections, many of Arakawa's artworks are permanently housed in prestigious museums around the world, including: The Metropolitan Museum of Art, New York; Museum of Modern Art, New York; National Museum of Modern Art, Tokyo; Centre Pompidou, Paris; Sezon Museum of Modern Art, Karuizawa, Japan.

== See also ==
- Madeline Gins
- Reversible Destiny Foundation
- Nagi Museum Of Contemporary Art
