= Naoki Tanemura =

Japanese writer

Naoki Tanemura (種村 直樹, Tanemura Naoki; March 7, 1936 – November 6, 2014) was a Japanese writer, essayist and critic. He called himself a "railway writer". He had published commentaries on railways and travel writings including mysteries.

He came from Ōtsu, Shiga Prefecture. He graduated from Shiga Prefectural Zeze High School and then the Department of Law of Kyoto University. He became a journalist of the Mainichi Shimbun, and became independent afterwards.

Tanemura was well informed about the railways in Japan. His travel style in his book called "Kimagure Ressha" (capricious train) influenced a lot of young people.

Tanemura had a fan club. Writers in Japan who have their own fan club is considerably few. He traveled with the members of the fan club and he often wrote about them in his works.

Tanemura was an authority of a hobby named "travel savings" (旅行貯金, ryokō chokin), where participants around the country deposit a small amount of money at post offices (and Japan Post Bank) to collect the rubber stamps of the post offices.

== See also ==
- Shunzō Miyawaki
