= I'm Not Getting Enough =

2001 song by Yoko Ono

Song by Yoko Ono

from the album Blueprint for a Sunrise
- Released: 9 November 2001
- Genre: Rock; experimental
- Length: 3:26
- Label: Capitol
- Songwriter: Yoko Ono
- Producers: Yoko Ono and Rob Stevens

"I'm Not Getting Enough"

Single by Yoko Ono
- Released: 5 May 2009
- Label: Mind Train, Twisted Records
- Songwriter: Yoko Ono

Yoko Ono singles chronology
"Give Peace a Chance" (2008)	"I'm Not Getting Enough" (2009)	"Give Me Something" (2010)

"I'm Not Getting Enough" is a song by Yoko Ono, originally released in 2001 on the album Blueprint for a Sunrise. In 2009, the song was remixed and released as digital green releases (no materials used or abused) by Mind Train and Twisted Records on iTunes and the Twisted Records online store.

== Critical reception ==
Bertrand Joseph-Pare, in his review of the "I'm Not Getting Enough" remixes for About.com, commented, "All things considered, this package contains quite a few nice and interesting mixes. However, it isn't anywhere near as original and groundbreaking as any of ONO's previous efforts."

== Track listing ==
- Digital download
1. "I'm Not Getting Enough" (Dave Audé Club Mix) – 7:08
2. "I'm Not Getting Enough" (Dave Audé Dub) – 6:52
3. "I'm Not Getting Enough" (Eddie Amador Club Mix) – 8:50
4. "I'm Not Getting Enough" (Eddie Amador Dub) – 9:04
5. "I'm Not Getting Enough" (Eddie Amador's Space Transmission Vocal Mix) – 8:35
6. "I'm Not Getting Enough" (Eddie Amador's Space Transmission Dub) – 8:56
7. "I'm Not Getting Enough" (Craig C & Niques Tribal Vocal Mix) - 8:09
8. "I'm Not Getting Enough" (Craig C & Niques Tribal Dub) – 7:02
9. "I'm Not Getting Enough" (Zoned Out Mix) – 6:43
10. "I'm Not Getting Enough" (Morgan Page Vocal Mix) – 7:37
11. "I'm Not Getting Enough" (Morgan Page Dub) – 7:37
12. "I'm Not Getting Enough" (Double B Club Mix) – 5:53

== Charts ==
Chart (2009)	Peak position
US Dance Club Songs (Billboard)	1
Global Dance Tracks (Billboard)	19

=== Year-end charts ===
Chart (2009)	Position
US Hot Dance Club Songs (Billboard)	15
