= Blueprint for a Sunrise =

2001 studio album by Yoko Ono

Studio album by Yoko Ono
- Released: 9 November 2001
- Recorded: Quad Recording, New York City
- Genres: Rock; experimental rock
- Length: 46:59
- Label: Capitol
- Producers: Yoko Ono and Rob Stevens

Yoko Ono chronology
A Story (1997)	Blueprint for a Sunrise (2001)	Yes, I'm a Witch (2007)

Professional ratings
Review scores
Source	Rating
AllMusic	2.5/5 stars
Pitchfork	5.6/10
Rolling Stone	3.5/5 stars

Blueprint for a Sunrise is the tenth studio album by Japanese artist and musician Yoko Ono. It was released on November 9, 2001 as a concept album of experimental feminist rock, it features live tracks, samples, and remixes of previous recordings. The album incorporates personal details from Ono's childhood in Japan alongside overarching themes of the suffering and frustration of women. In the liner notes, Ono talks about the continuing relevance of feminism and "waking up in the middle of the night hearing thousands of women screaming".

On the cover of the album, Ono portrays herself as the Chinese Empress Dowager Cixi, collaging her face and an x-ray image onto a cropped and re-colored version of Hubert Vos's portrait of the Empress.

As of September 2009, the album had sold around 3,000 copies in the USA. On February 18, 2024, the album was released on digital platforms, such as Spotify.

== Track listing ==
All tracks are written by Yoko Ono.

No.	Title	Length
1.	"I Want You to Remember Me "A""	1:22
2.	"I Want You to Remember Me "B""	4:08
3.	"Is This What We Do"	2:58
4.	"Wouldnit "swing""	2:38
5.	"Soul Got Out of the Box"	2:14
6.	"Rising II"	12:52
7.	"It's Time for Action !"	3:25
8.	"I'm Not Getting Enough"	3:26
9.	"Mulberry"	8:34
10.	"I Remember Everything"	2:40
11.	"Are You Looking for Me?"	2:03

Japan exclusive bonus tracks
No.	Title	Length
12.	"Yume O Moto"	3:47
13.	"Joseijoi Banzai"	2:57

- "Wouldnit "swing"" is a remix of "Wouldnit" from Rising.
- "Soul Got Out of the Box" was originally a 1972 outtake from Approximately Infinite Universe.
- "Rising II" and "Mulberry" are live performances.
- The Queen Charlotte's Hospital tape demo of "Mulberry" was previously released in 1997 on the CD Reissue of Life with the Lions.
- "I Remember Everything" was written for the play "Hiroshima" (1997) after much coaxing from Playwright Ron Destro. This song was also performed live at the Itsukushima Shrine in Japan 1995.
- The Japanese bonus tracks were previously released as singles in 1973 and 1974.

== A Blueprint for a Sunrise ==
A Blueprint for a Sunrise

EP by Yoko Ono
- Released: 2000
- Recorded: 2000
- Studios: Sear Sound, New York City
- Genres: Rock; experimental rock
- Length: 24:00
- Label: Japan Society
- Producer: Yoko Ono

Yoko Ono chronology
A Story (1997)	A Blueprint for a Sunrise (2000)	Blueprint for a Sunrise (2001)

This CD was included with the book Yes Yoko Ono published in 2000. An exhibition with the same title was held at the Japan Society Gallery in New York City from October 18, 2000, to January 14, 2001.

Alternate versions of "Are You Looking for Me?" and "It's Time for Action" would later be included on Yoko's 2001 studio album Blueprint for a Sunrise.

All tracks are written by Yoko Ono.

No.	Title	Length
1.	"The Paths"	7:18
2.	"Are You Looking for Me?"	7:07
3.	"It's Time for Action / Outro"	9:34

== Personnel ==
- Yoko Ono – lead vocals
- Sean Lennon – guitars, keyboards
- Timo Ellis – guitars, bass guitar, drums
- Chris Maxwell – guitars
- Erik Sanko – bass guitar
- Zeena Parkins – electric harp
- Hearn Gadbois – percussion
- Ringo Starr – drums
- Sam Koppelman – drums, percussion

It's Time for Action

- Yoko Ono – English
- Yodit Abate – Ethiopian
- Nikki Borodi – Hungarian / Russian / Hebrew
- Manjit Devgun – Punjabi
- Ghida Fakhry – Arabic
- Dania Hachey – French
- Nazan Karsan – Turkish
- Eva Lee – Chinese
- Young Wha Lee – Korean
- Maike Paul – German
- Anne Terada – Portuguese
- Midori Yoshimoto – Japanese
- Eva Zanardi – Italian
- Fatemeh Ziai – Persian

== Release history ==
Country	Date	Format	Label	Catalog	Ref.
Japan	6 October 2001	CD	Capitol Records	TOCP-65916	
United Kingdom	9 October 2001	CD	Capitol Records	5360352	
United States	9 November 2001	CD	Capitol Records	CDP 724353606526	
