= John Lennon Museum =

Now-closed museum in Japan

Coordinates: 35°53′41.60″N 139°37′51.00″E

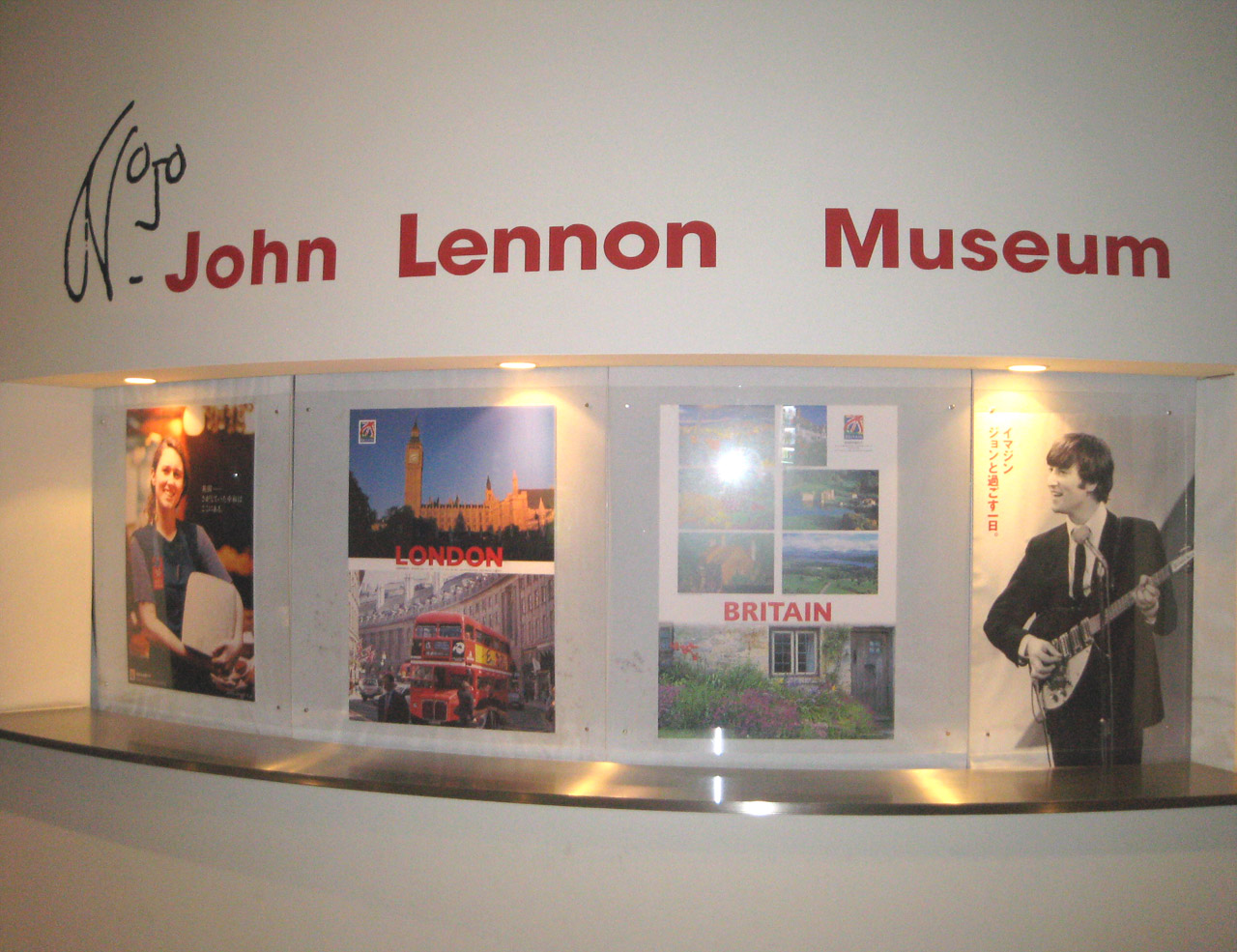
Display at the entrance

John Lennon Museum (ジョン・レノン・ミュージアム, Jon Renon Myūjiamu) was a museum located inside the Saitama Super Arena in Chūō-ku, Saitama, Saitama Prefecture, Japan.

== History ==
The John Lennon Museum opened on October 9, 2000, the 60th anniversary of Lennon's birth, and closed on September 30, 2010, when its exhibit contract with Yoko Ono expired. It was located inside the Saitama Super Arena in Chūō-ku, Saitama, Saitama Prefecture, Japan.

== Contents ==
The museum was established to preserve knowledge of John Lennon's life and musical career; it displayed Lennon's widow Yoko Ono's collection of his memorabilia as well as other displays. A tour of the museum began with a welcoming message and short film narrated by Yoko Ono (in Japanese with English headphones available), and ended at an avant-garde styled "reflection room" full of chairs facing a slide show of moving words and images. After this room there was a gift shop with John Lennon memorabilia available.

== See also ==
- List of music museums
