= Wouldnit (I'm a Star) =

2010 single by Yoko Ono

Song by Yoko Ono

from the album Rising
- Released: 18 January 1996
- Genre: Rock
- Length: 3:02
- Label: Capitol
- Songwriter: Yoko Ono
- Producers: Yoko Ono and Rob Stevens

"Wouldnit "swing""

Song by Yoko Ono

from the album Blueprint for a Sunrise
- Released: 9 November 2001
- Genre: Rock; experimental
- Length: 2:38
- Label: Capitol
- Songwriter: Yoko Ono
- Producers: Yoko Ono and Rob Stevens

"Wouldnit (I'm a Star)"

Single by Yoko Ono
- Released: 2010
- Genre: Jazz; dance
- Label: Mind Train, Twisted Records
- Songwriter: Yoko Ono
- Producers: Yoko Ono, Rob Stevens

Yoko Ono singles chronology
"Give Me Something" (2010)	"Wouldnit (I'm a Star)" (2010)	"Move on Fast" (2011)

"Wouldnit (I'm a Star)" is a song by Yoko Ono, originally released in 1996 on the album Rising. A remix of the song appeared on Ono's 2001 album Blueprint for a Sunrise.

== Background ==
Yoko Ono stated in an interview that the song was inspired by her childhood when her pianist father put her into musical training at the age of two and a half years old, but also the first song she wrote, called "Jiyu-Gakuen".

== Critical reception ==
David Fricke, in his review of Rising for Rolling Stone, stated, "The plain-spoken shiver with which she renders the episodes of rape, murder and child abuse in the bone-dry reggae stroll 'Wouldnit' suggests the dark intimacy of a frightened young girl's secret diary." Dominique Leone of Pitchfork Media opined that the version that appeared on Blueprint for a Sunrise is "merely awkward. Ono drops lines [...] over a cocktail lounge groove destined for Hell's karaoke bars." Rolling Stone's David Fricke described the Blueprint for a Sunrise version as a "creepy jazz-funk remake."

== Track listing ==
- Digital download
1. "Wouldnit (I'm a Star)" (Dave Audé Radio Mix) – 3:57
2. "Wouldnit (I'm a Star)" (Dave Audé Club Mix) – 7:04
3. "Wouldnit (I'm a Star)" (Emjae Club Mix) – 4:48
4. "Wouldnit (I'm a Star)" (Ralphi Rosario Club Mix) – 6:57
5. "Wouldnit (I'm a Star)" (Richard Morel Vocal Mix) – 8:53
6. "Wouldnit (I'm a Star)" (Rob Rives Back 2 the Factory Mix) – 7:21
7. "Wouldnit (I'm a Star)" (DTM Main Mix) – 6:23
8. "Wouldnit (I'm a Star)" (Timmy Loop's Electric Club Remix) – 6:51
9. "Wouldnit (I'm a Star)" (M-Deep Club) – 5:15
- Digital download (Dub Mixes)
1. "Wouldnit (I'm a Star)" (Dave Audé Dub Mix) – 5:59
2. "Wouldnit (I'm a Star)" (Richard Morel Dub Mix) – 7:41
3. "Wouldnit (I'm a Star)" (Emjae Dub) – 6:31
4. "Wouldnit (I'm a Star)" (Ralphi Rosario Dub Mix) – 6:57
5. "Wouldnit (I'm a Star)" (Rob Rives Back 2 The Factory Instrumental) – 7:21
6. "Wouldnit (I'm a Star)" (Yiannis 'I'm a Star, Get It' Vocal Dub) – 7:45
7. "Wouldnit (I'm a Star)" (Yiannis 'I'm a Star, Get It' Instrumental) – 7:45
8. "Wouldnit (I'm a Star)" (DTM Dub) – 6:53

== Charts ==
=== Weekly charts ===
Chart (2010)	Peak position
US Dance Club Songs (Billboard)	1
Global Dance Tracks (Billboard)	24

=== Year-end charts ===
Chart (2010)	Position
US Hot Dance Club Songs (Billboard)	50

== See also ==
- List of number-one dance singles of 2010 (U.S.)
