= Bachelors Anonymous (band) =

American synth-pop duo

- Bachelors Anonymous, 1985. Left to right: Hughes and Berg.

Background information
- Origin: Los Angeles, California, US
- Genres: Synth-pop
- Years active: 1984–1992, 2020s
- Label: Significant Other
- Past members: Rob Berg; David Hughes; Guest members Bonnie Cirino, Carrah Macy (now Wright), Jack Dubowsky, Del Mar Richardson, Tom Kidd, Lee Demko, Anne Atwell-Zoll, Ann Russell, John Lacques
- Website: bachelorsanonymous.band
- Logo

Bachelors Anonymous was an American synth-pop duo formed in 1984 in Los Angeles by songwriters Rob Berg (keyboards, vocals) and David Hughes (drum machine, vocals).

The duo has been described by music journalist Tom Kidd as "performance artists and social realists." Regarding their music, author Stuart Timmons wrote, "Combining percussion and synthesizer with voice, they display an impressive audio palette. The Bachelors' sound tends to percolate, carbonate, howl and soar as it boogies."

== Formation ==
Bachelors Anonymous was formed after Rob "DigiRob" Berg left the Ramakrishna Monastery in Hollywood, as well as his band The Razor's Edge, in 1983, and following the breakup in 1983 of David Hughes's rap group Age of Consent. Berg met Hughes at a Catholic choir rehearsal and the two exchanged tapes. They collaborated on "Inscription" in May 1984, which was reworked as "Ritual Life"; both tracks appear on the 2021 reissue of their first album, Bachelors Anonymous (1985). They formed as a duo that same year, taking their name from the title of a prospectus for a gay organization, authored by Harry Hay.

In the fall of 1984, prior to their first public performance, Berg and Hughes worked with actor and performance artist John Fleck along with musician Lance Loud on a play titled In a Viennese Vein for Kristian Hoffman's Halloween variety show, Zombie Jamboree, at the Lhasa Club. Audio from the performance was released in 2025 as In a Viennese Vein by Bachelors Anonymous featuring John Fleck.

== Career ==
Bachelors Anonymous's debut performance was at the Anti-Club on January 24, 1985. Also on the bill were Scott Carter, Fred Wolf, and Marsha Mann & Radames Pera. Bachelors Anonymous self-released its six-song eponymous debut album on audiocassette later that year.

In 1987, Bachelors Anonymous released a 7" single, "God Rest You Merry, Gentlemen" b/w "Mr. Wenceslas", on Significant Other Records.

Beginning in 2020, Bachelors Anonymous digitally reissued physical releases as well as unreleased material and new tracks.

== Tours and shows ==
Bachelors Anonymous performing at Christopher Street West (Los Angeles Pride), June 1988. (L-R) Robert Berg, Del Mar Richardson, David Hughes, and Tom Kidd. (Photographer unknown)

In the spring of 1985, Bachelors Anonymous took part in Los Angeles performances of La Brea Circus, an "art cabaret" that included Apache Dancers, Jim Chernick, John Fleck, Phillip Littell, and Perpetua.

La Brea Circus played two dates in San Francisco, at Graffiti on May 26, 1985, and 16th Note on May 27, 1985.

Besides appearing at various nightclubs in the Los Angeles area, Bachelors Anonymous performed at several benefits:

- Feminist Women's Health Clinic, September 8, 1985, Anti-Club
- Against Proposition 64, October 26, 1986, Lhasa Club
- Rock Against AIDS, May 31, 1987, Variety Arts Center
- ACT UP/LA, March 26, 1988, The Athletic Club

== Stage and screen ==
Berg and Hughes contributed the score to John Fleck's one-man show, I Got the He-Be-She-Be's, directed by David Schweizer, which debuted on October 24, 1986, at the Wallenboyd Theatre in Los Angeles. It received a 1986 LA Weekly Theater Award for Performance in a One-Character Show. The soundtrack was released in 2025 as Music From John Fleck's I Got the He-Be-She-Be's and Other Plays.

Berg and Hughes contributed sound design to the 1987 feature film Under the Gun starring Sam Jones and Vanessa Williams, directed by James Sbardellati.

Berg and Hughes contributed to the score of Zack's production of Home or Future Soap by Megan Terry on February 9–10, 1987, during Zack's first year in UCLA’s MFA directing program. Selections from the score were released on the albums In the Land of Nod ("Salt Doll"), The Big Picture ("Exercise in Revolution"), and Music from John Fleck's I Got the He-Be-She-Be's and Other Plays ("Appreciation", "Dreams", "Morning") as well as the EP Like ("Salt Doll Gita", "Exercise in Eternity").

Terri Lewis Dance Ensemble performed Bachelors to a suite of songs by Bachelors Anonymous, choreographed by Anne Atwell-Zoll, at Occidental College on December 1, 1990.

Berg and Hughes contributed the score to the ZP Productions staging of Suitcase, a one-act by Kōbō Abe, at The Lab, San Francisco, January 10–20, 1991. “Happy Birthday Mona Lisa” from the play was released in 2025 on the album Music from John Fleck's I Got the He-Be-She-Be's and Other Plays.

Berg and Hughes contributed the score to the Rudy Perez Performance Ensemble production of Made in L.A., performed at LACE February 8, 9 and 10, 1991. Perez's solo, "Remain in Light," received the Lester Horton Award for Outstanding Performance/Solo in 1991. Perez reprised the solo in the series Dance Without Borders at the Japan America Theatre on May 20, 1994. The score was released in 2023 as Made In L.A. – Music for Rudy Perez Performance Ensemble.

== Music videos ==
In 1990 Bachelors Anonymous released a music video for the song "Looking For You" with screenplay co-written by performance artist Tim Bennett and Bachelors Anonymous, directed by Adam Soch.

In 2025 Bachelors Anonymous released a music video for the song "I've Got the Hunger" featuring John Fleck, directed by Armin Siljkovic. The duo also released a music video inspired by the song "Salt Doll Gita", featuring the vocals of Reewa Rathod, created by Berg.

== Discography ==
=== Studio albums ===
- Bachelors Anonymous (1985, not on label)
1. "Grand Illusion" (Berg)
2. "Ritual Life" (Berg, Hughes)
3. "Sarasponda" (Berg, Hughes)
4. "Stranger's Bed" (Berg, Hughes)
5. "Nick" (Berg, Hughes)
6. "Siegfried" (Berg)
- In the Land of Nod (2021, not on label; Berg, Hughes)
1. "Play Safely" – 5:05
2. "Victor The Beefcake" – 4:10
3. "Land Of Nod" – 6:23
4. "Looking For You" – 5:05
5. "The Price Of Love" – 5:17
6. "The Bells Of La Brea" – 6:21
7. "Land Of Nod (Men's Dept)" – 6:30
8. "Salt Doll" – 3:53
- The Big Picture (2022, not on label; Berg, Hughes except as noted)
1. "What's This Feeling?" – 4:37
2. "In Another Time" – 5:00
3. "Our Creation" – 4:14
4. "Seriously" – 4:57
5. "Laissez-Faire" – 3:09
6. "Father's Day" – 4:38
7. "On, On, On, On... (Adrian Belew, Chris Frantz, Tina Weymouth) – 3:19
8. "Exercise In Revolution" (Julian Beck, Berg, Hughes) – 4:41
- Made In L.A. – Music for Rudy Perez Performance Ensemble (2023, not on label; Berg, Hughes)
1. "Loop I – Spiritual Quest" – 18:39
2. "Remain In Light, Or Take Back Your Yellow Ribbon" – 10:21
3. "Loop II – Altered Vision Part 1" – 6:31
4. "Loop II – Altered Vision Part 2" – 4:22
5. "Loop II – Altered Vision Part 3" – 5:51
6. "Loop II – Altered Vision Part 4" – 3:13
- In a Viennese Vein feat. John Fleck (2025, not on label)
1. "The Cold Song" (John Dryden, Henry Purcell) – 4:04
2. "Happy Birthday Leopold" (Berg, Hughes) – 6:00
3. "It's My Party (I'll Die If I Want To) [Parody]" (Seymour Gottlieb, Herbert Weiner, John Gluck Jr., Wally Gold, John Fleck) – 2:04
4. "Strangers In the Night" (Bert Kaempfert) – 1:38
5. "We've Only Just Begun" (Roger Nichols) – 1:23
6. "I've Got the Hunger" (Berg, Hughes) – 3:18
- Music from John Fleck's I Got the He-Be-She-Be's and Other Plays (2025, not on label; Berg, Hughes except as noted)
1. "Heaven" – 4:06
2. "Hell" – 4:03
3. "Armchair" – Waltz 3:13
4. "Honey I'm Home" – 1:22
5. "Sex" – 1:40
6. "Hell Blues" – 2:13
7. "Appreciation" – 10:23
8. "Dreams" – 8:05
9. "Morning / Anthem" (Megan Terry, Berg, Hughes) – 2:16
10. "Happy Birthday Mona Lisa" (Kōbō Abe, Berg, Hughes) – 1:16
11. "Sinbad's Shipwreck" (Nikolai Rimsky-Korsakov, Berg) – 3:46

=== EPs and singles ===
- God Rest You Merry, Gentlemen (1987, Significant Other)

A. "God Rest You Merry, Gentlemen" (Traditional, Berg, Hughes) – 3:58
AA. "Mr. Wenceslas" (Traditional, Berg) – 4:45

- The Flesh Failures (Let the Sunshine In) (2020, not on label)

"The Flesh Failures (Let the Sunshine In)" (Gerome Ragni, James Rado, Galt MacDermot) – 4:59

- What's This Feeling? (2021, not on label)

"What's This Feeling?" (Berg, Hughes) – 4:37

- Like (2025, not on label)
1. "Like" (Lou Stone Borenstein, Berg, Hughes) – 4:00
2. "Heads In the Clouds" (Berg) – 5:02
3. "J.P.P. McStep B. Blues" (Alexander Spence) – 2:44
4. "Salt Doll Gita" feat. Reewa Rathod (Traditional, Berg, Hughes) – 3:53
5. "Exercise in Eternity" (Berg, Hughes) – 4:40

=== Compilation appearances ===
- Deep Entries: Gay Electronic Excursions 1980–1985 (2024, Dark Entries)

"A Stranger's Bed" (Berg, Hughes) – 4:01

=== Reissues ===
- God Rest You Merry, Gentlemen (2020, not on label)
1. "God Rest You Merry, Gentlemen" (Traditional, Berg, Hughes) – 3:58
2. "Mr. Wenceslas" (Traditional, Berg) – 4:45
- Bachelors Anonymous (2021, not on label)
1. "Grand Illusion" (Berg) – 4:16
2. "Ritual Life" (Berg, Hughes) – 3:58
3. "Sarasponda" (Berg, Hughes) – 3:58
4. "A Stranger's Bed" (Berg, Hughes) – 4:04
5. "Nick" (Berg, Hughes) – 3:28
6. "Zigfreed" (Berg) – 4:59

Bonus tracks

7. "Inscription" (Berg, Hughes) – 4:33
8. "A Stranger's Bed '90" (Berg, Hughes) – 5:31

=== Songs covered by others ===
- "A Stranger's Bed" lyrics and melody are incorporated into "Don't Talk To Strangers" on Lover Boy by Ariel Pink's Haunted Graffiti
