= Yoshiyuki =

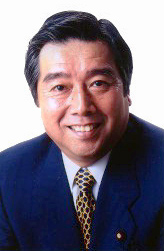
- Yoshiyuki Kamei (1936–2006), Japanese politician
- Pronunciation: joɕijɯkʲi (IPA)
- Gender: Male

Origin
- Origin: Japanese
- Meaning: depends on the kanji used.

Other names
- Alternative spelling: Yosiyuki (Kunrei-shiki) Yosiyuki (Nihon-shiki) Yoshiyuki (Hepburn)

Yoshiyuki is both a masculine Japanese given name and a Japanese surname.

== Written forms ==
Yoshiyuki can be written using many different combinations of kanji characters. Here are some examples:

- 義幸, "justice, happiness"
- 義之, "justice, of"
- 義行, "justice, to go"
- 吉幸, "good luck, happiness"
- 吉之, "good luck, of"
- 吉行, "good luck, to go"
- 善幸, "virtuous, happiness"
- 善之, "virtuous, of"
- 善行, "virtuous, to go"
- 芳幸, "virtuous/fragrant, happiness"
- 芳之, "virtuous/fragrant, of"
- 芳行, "virtuous/fragrant, to go"
- 嘉之, "excellent, of"
- 嘉行, "excellent, to go"
- 好之, "good/like something, of"
- 慶之, "congratulate, of"
- 良幸, "good, happiness"

The name can also be written in hiragana よしゆき or katakana ヨシユキ.

== Notable people with the given name Yoshiyuki ==
- Yoshiyuki Ichihashi (市橋 善行; born 1949), Japanese bobsledder
- Yoshiyuki Homarefuji (誉富士 歓之; born 1985), Japanese sumo wrestler
- Yoshiyuki Iwamoto (岩本 義行, 1912–2008), Japanese baseball player
- Yoshiyuki Kamei (亀井 善之, 1936–2006), Japanese politician
- Yoshiyuki Kato (加藤 善之; born 1964), Japanese footballer and manager
- Yoshiyuki Kawashima (川島 義之, 1878–1945), general in the Imperial Japanese Army
- Yoshiyuki Kobayashi (小林 慶行; born 1978), Japanese footballer
- Yoshiyuki Konishi (小西 良幸; born 1950), Japanese fashion designer
- Yoshiyuki Kouno (河野 義行, born 1950), victim of the Matsumoto incident
- Yoshiyuki Kubota (窪田 義行, born 1972), Japanese shogi player
- Yoshiyuki Matsumoto (松本 佳介, born 1971), Japanese shogi player
- Yoshiyuki Matsuoka (松岡 義之, born 1957), Japanese judoka
- Yoshiyuki Mizumoto (水本 良幸; born 1969), Japanese swimmer
- Yoshiyuki Ogata (緒方 良行, born 1998), Japanese climber
- Yoshiyuki Ohmiya (近江谷 好幸; born 1959), Japanese curler and curling coach
- Yoshiyuki Sadamoto (貞本 義行, born 1962), Japanese character designer and manga artist
- Yoshiyuki Sakaki (榊 佳之, born 1942), Japanese molecular biologist
- Yoshiyuki Sato (佐藤 佳幸, born 1975), Japanese ski mountaineer
- Yoshiyuki Shimizu (清水 祥之; born 1969), Japanese speed skater
- Yoshiyuki Shimozuma (下妻 由幸, born 1977), Japanese voice actor
- Yoshiyuki Tomino (富野 喜幸, born 1941), Japanese anime creator, director, screenwriter and novelist
- Yoshiyuki Tsuruta (鶴田 義行, 1903–1986), Japanese swimmer
- Yoshiyuki Yoshida (吉田 善行, born 1974), Japanese mixed martial artist

== Notable people with the surname Yoshiyuki ==
- Eisuke Yoshiyuki (吉行 栄助, 1906–1940), Japanese writer
- Junnosuke Yoshiyuki (吉行 淳之介, 1923–1994), Japanese writer
- Kazuko Yoshiyuki (吉行 和子, 1935–2025), Japanese actress, voice actress and essayist
- Kohei Yoshiyuki (吉行 耕平, born 1946), Japanese photographer
- Rie Yoshiyuki (吉行 理恵; 1939–2006), Japanese poet and writer
- Yumi Yoshiyuki (吉行 由実, born 1965), Japanese film director, actress, and screenwriter

== See also ==
- 5172 Yoshiyuki, a main-belt asteroid
