= Box Man =

Box man or boxman may refer to:

== Arts, entertainment and literature ==
- The Box Man (novel), a novel by Kōbō Abe
- The Box Man (manga), a manga by Imiri Sakabashira
- The Box Man (film), a 2024 Japanese film by Gakuryū Ishii on eponymous novel

== Occupation ==
- A box man, the slang term for a safecracker
- The boxman, a casino employee who supervises the craps table
- The "box man", a member of the American football chain crew
