= Mainichi Film Award for Best Art Direction =

Annual Japanese film awards

- Awarded for: Best art direction of the year
- Country: Japan
- First award: 1947

The Mainichi Film Award for Best Art Direction is a film award given at the Mainichi Film Awards.

== List of winners ==
Year	Film	Art Director
1947	Ima Hitotabi no	So Matsuyama
1948	Waga Shōgai no Kagayakeru Hi; A Hen in the Wind	Tatsuo Hamada
1949	Stray Dog	So Matsuyama
1950	Itsuwareru Gisō	Hiroshi Mizutani
1951	Dokkoi Ikiteru; Wakare Gumo	Kazuo Kubo
1952	Nishijin no Shimai	Kazumi Koike
1953	Gan; Ugetsu	Kisaku Itō
1954	A Certain Woman; Kuroi Shio	Takeo Kimura
1955	Tasogare Sakaba	Juichi Itō
1956	Nagareru	Satoru Chūko
1957	Throne of Blood; The Lower Depths	Yoshirō Muraki
1958	The Snowy Heron	Atsuji Shibata
1959	Naniwa no Koi no Monogatari; Dai Bosatsu Tōge Kanketsu-hen	Takatoshi Suzuki
1960	Her Brother	Tomoo Shimogawara
1961	Hangyakuji	Chōshirō Katsura
1962	Harakiri	Junichi Ōsumi; Shigemasa Toda
1963	Echizen Take Ningyō; An Actor's Revenge	Yoshinobu Nishioka
1964	The Woman in the Dunes	Toshitetsu Hirakawa; Masao Yamazaki
1965	Kwaidan	Shigemasa Toda
1966	The Face of Another; The River Ki	Masao Yamazaki
1967	Sekishun	Chiyoo Umeda
1968	Judge and Jeopardy; The Human Bullet; Kill!	Isao Akune
1969	Goyokin	Motoji Kojima
1970	Men and War: Part I	Yoshinaga Yokoo; Hiroshi Fukatami
1971	Inochi Bō ni Furō	Hiroshi Mizutani
1972	Kaigun Tokubetsu Shōnen Hei	Yoshirō Muraki
1973	Long Journey into Love	Shinobu Muraki
1974	Karei Naru Ichizoku	Yoshinaga Yokoo; Takeshi Ōmura
1975	Tora-san's Rise and Fall; Harakara	Kiminobu Satō
1976	Fumō Chitai; Daichi no Komoriuta	Shigeo Mano
1977	N/A	N/A
1978	The Incident; The Demon	Kyōhei Morita
1979	Nomugi Pass	Shigeo Mano
1980	Kagemusha	Yoshirō Muraki
1981	Willful Murder	Takeo Kimura
1982	Fall Guy	Akira Takahashi
1983	The Makioka Sisters	Shinobu Murakami
1984	Ohan	Shinobu Murakami
1985	Sorekara; Yasha; Ma no Toki	Tsutomu Imamura
1986	The Sea and Poison; House of Wedlock; Yume Miru Yō ni Nemuritai	Takeo Kimura
1987	Yoshiwara Enjō; Hachiko Monogatari; The Man Who Assassinated Ryoma	Yoshinobu Nishioka
1988	Tomorrow	Akira Naitō
1989	Black Rain	Hisao Inagaki
1990	Roningai; Ruten no Umi; Isan Sōzoku	Akira Naitō
1991	Sensō to Seishun	Akira Haruki
1992	The River with No Bridge; Kantsubaki	Akira Naitō
1993	Byōin de Shinu to Iukoto; Bōkyō	Shigeo Mano
1994	Shinonomerō Onna no Ran	Norimichi Ikawa
1995	Ashita	Kazuo Takenaka
1996	Sleeping Man	Yoshinaga Yokoo
1997	A Lost Paradise	Hidetaka Ozawa
1998	Begging for Love; Cure	Katsumi Nakazawa
1999	After Life	Toshihiro Isomi; Hideo Gunji
2000	Zawazawa Shimokitazawa; Face	Mitsuo Harada
2001	Kazahana; Minna no Ie	Fumio Ogawa
2002	Yoru o Kakete	Satoshi Ōtsuka
2003	Doing Time; Battle Royale II: Requiem	Toshihiro Isomi
2004	Kamikaze Girls	Towako Kuwajima
2005	Always Sanchōme no Yūhi	Anri Kamijō
2006	The Uchōten Hotel; Hula Girls	Yōhei Taneda
2007	Sukiyaki Western Django	Hisashi Sasaki
2008	Nishi no Majo ga Shinda	Kyōko Yauchi
2009	Villon's Wife	Yōhei Taneda; Kyōko Yauchi
2010	Bushi no Kakeibo	Nariyuki Kondō
2011	Postcard	Hirokazu Kanakatsu
2012	Tenchi: The Samurai Astronomer	Kyōko Heya
2013	The Great Passage	Mitsuo Harada
2014	Over Your Dead Body	Yūji Hayashida; Eri Sakushima
2015	The Emperor in August	Tetsuo Harada
2016	Shin Godzilla	Yūji Hayashida; Eri Sakushima
2017	Hanagatami	Kōichi Takeuchi
2018	Every Day A Good Day	Mitsuo Harada; Genki Horime
2019	Talking the Pictures	Norihiro Isoda
2020	Tezuka's Barbara	Toshihiro Isomi; Emiko Tsuyuki
2021	Baragaki: Unbroken Samurai	Tetsuo Harada
2022	Lesson in Murder	Tsutomu Imamura; Takayuki Nitta
2023	Godzilla Minus One	Anri Jōjō
2024	The Box Man	Yūji Hayashida
2025	Kokuho	Yohei Taneda; Nao Shimoyama
