= The Woman in the Dunes =

1962 novel by Kobo Abe

- Cover of the first Japanese edition
- Author: Kōbō Abe
- Original title: Suna no Onna
- Translator: E. Dale Saunders
- Illustrator: Machi Abe
- Cover artist: Yasuo Kazuki
- Published: 1962
- Publication place: Japan
- English publication date: 1964
- Media type: Print
- Pages: 240 [U.S. Edition]
- Awards: Yomiuri Prize
- ISBN: 9780679733782
- OCLC: 325734
- LC Class: PZ4.A13 Wo

The Woman in the Dunes (Japanese: 砂の女, Hepburn: Suna no Onna; lit. "Sand Woman") is a novel by the Japanese writer Kōbō Abe, published in 1962. It won the 1962 Yomiuri Prize for literature, and an English translation by E. Dale Saunders, and a film adaptation, directed by Hiroshi Teshigahara, appeared in 1964.

The novel is intended as a commentary on the claustrophobic and limiting nature of existence, as well as a critique of certain aspects of Japanese social behavior. The story is preceded by the aphorism "Without the threat of punishment there is no joy in flight."

== Plot ==
In 1955, Jumpei Niki, a school teacher from Tokyo, visits a fishing village to collect insects. After missing the last bus, he is led by the villagers, in an act of apparent hospitality, to a house in the dunes that can be reached only by rope ladder. The next morning the ladder is gone and he finds he is expected to keep the house clear of sand with the woman living there, with whom he is also to produce children. He learns that the village, which is constantly on the verge of being destroyed by the advancing sand dunes, has developed a system of surveillance and forced labor to save itself: "Just to protect this pitiful bit of geography, more than ten households on the seaside had to submit to a life of slavery." From the woman in the house he learns that he is not the first visitor to the village to be trapped and subjugated in this way, and he becomes desperate to escape. After a doomed escape attempt in which he is chased into quicksand and forced to plea with his captors to save his life, he is returned to the house in the dunes. Ultimately, he finds a way to collect water which gives him a purpose and a sense of liberty. He also wants to share the knowledge of his technique of water collection with the villagers someday. He eventually gives up trying to escape when he comes to realize that returning to his old life would give him no more liberty. He accepts his new identity and family. After seven years, he is proclaimed officially dead. (In the original Japanese version, he is proclaimed officially as a missing person.)

== Publication, reception, and legacy ==
The book attracted much attention in Japan on its publication in 1962, earning praise from critics as well as contemporaries such as Kenzaburō Ōe and Yukio Mishima. It won that year's Yomiuri Prize for literature. An English translation appeared in 1964, as did a film adaptation directed by Hiroshi Teshigahara starring Eiji Okada and Kyōko Kishida which won the Special Jury Prize at the 1964 Cannes Film Festival.

== Major themes ==
=== Incarceration and forced labor ===
Marianne Marroum reads the novel alongside the work of Michel Foucault as a depiction of "the world as a penal colony." According to this reading, the villagers' demand for forced labor—men and women compelled to shovel away the sand that threatens constantly to destroy the village—can be interpreted as a portray of a society that must imprison some in order to ensure the freedom of others. The conditions in which Niki is kept, in which water is withheld from him if he refuses to work and he gradually loses contact with the outside world and his previous life, represent this society's means of disciplining his body and reducing him to an "instrument of labor." The novel's ambiguous ending, in which Niki seems to accept his role in the life of the village and no longer feels an urgent need to escape, results from a change in Niki's view of the village, which has ceased to be a penal colony for him and become instead a site of "resurrection and possible self-renewal," a testimony to Abe's conviction that individuals can choose to be free.

== Works cited ==
- O'Neil, Patrick M., ed. (2004). "Abe Kōbō". Great World Writers: Twentieth Century. Vol. 1. Marshall Cavendish.
- Treat, John Whittier (1994). "The Woman in the Dunes". In Miller, Barbara Stoler (ed.). Masterworks of Asian Literature in Comparative Perspective. A Guide for Teaching. Sharpe. pp. 457–469. ISBN 9780765631657.
- Marroum, Marianne (2007). ""Sands of Imprisonment, Subjugation, and Empowerment: Reading Foucault in Kobo Abe's The Woman in the Dunes."". The Comparatist. 31.
