= Pitfall (1962 film) =

- Directed by: Hiroshi Teshigahara
- Screenplay by: Kōbō Abe
- Based on: Rengoku by Kōbō Abe
- Produced by: Tadashi Ono
- Starring: Hisashi Igawa; Kazuo Miyahara; Kanichi Omiya
- Cinematography: Hiroshi Segawa
- Edited by: Fusako Shuzui
- Music by: Toshi Ichiyanagi; Yuji Takahashi
- Production company: Teshigahara Production
- Distributed by: Art Theatre Guild
- Release date: 1 July 1962 (Japan)
- Running time: 97 minutes
- Country: Japan

Pitfall (おとし穴, Otoshiana), a.k.a. The Pitfall and Kashi To Kodomo, is a 1962 Japanese film directed by Hiroshi Teshigahara, written by Kōbō Abe. It was Teshigahara's first feature, and the first of his four film collaborations with Abe, the others being Woman in the Dunes, The Face of Another and The Man Without a Map. Unlike the others, which are based on novels by Abe, Pitfall was originally a television play called Purgatory (Rengoku). The film has been included in The Criterion Collection. It is known for its surreal storytelling structure and themes of hopelessness, exploitation, and human suffering.

== Plot ==
A single father and his son escape a mining camp and venture into the countryside. A mysterious man dressed in a white suit, whose identity is never revealed, takes photographs of them from a nearby cemetery. As he plans to board a bus the next morning, the unemployed miner dreams of being in a labor union when he is reincarnated.

They arrive at a boardinghouse, where the miner is sent off to a village in Kyūshū where he is told he'll find work. Along the way, the miner and his son arrive at a ghost town, which is deserted except for one female shopkeeper. She tells him that the men in the village left after the mine was closed due to a possible cave-in. After she points them towards their intended direction, the miner leaves and is soon followed by the same man in a white suit. The man murders the miner and throws the knife into a riverbank.

The man in the white suit rides off into the ghost town and locates the shopkeeper, who had heard the murder from a distance. He bribes her to frame Otsuka, a union leader who bears an uncanny resemblance to the miner, as the murderer. Meanwhile, the ghost of the miner walks about, but those living cannot hear him. He returns to the ghost town in which he sees the ghostly inhabitants.

Detectives arrive and locate the corpse and inspect the knife wound before the body is transported. They also discover a photograph in the corpse's back pocket, which contains a resemblance to Otsuka. When he is alerted to this, Otsuka explains a faction of a labor union broke off and organized a second union at another pit. Otsuka phones Toyama, the union leader of the old pit, in which he pleads his innocence and wants to find the shopkeeper.

However, the shopkeeper is herself killed by the man in white. When Otsuka and Toyama learn of this, they blame each another and start a fight, which results in the deaths of both men. The man in white observes this before he rides off on his motorcycle, satisfied that his mission is complete. The miner's son, who witnessed everything, leaves the village and runs off into the distance.

== Cast ==
- Hisashi Igawa - Miner / Otsuka
- Sumie Sasaki - Shopkeeper
- Sen Yano - Toyama
- Hideo Kanze - Policeman
- Kunie Tanaka - Man in white suit
- Kei Satō - Reporter

== Production ==
The film's focus on the exploitation of coal miners was likely influenced by Teshigahara and Abe's political leanings, and their sympathy with the Tokyo demonstrations in 1960 against Anpo.

The film was shot in Kyūshū, and incorporates stock footage of mining disasters and starvation that had afflicted the area. Many of the visual devices and themes are similar to the contemporaneous work of Shōhei Imamura, whose 1959 film My Second Brother also featured Kyūshū coal miners.

Teshigahara often disagreed with his film crew, and fired two assistant directors who did not wish to include the scene in which the policeman rapes the shopkeeper.

== Release ==
Pitfall was first distributed by the Art Theatre Guild (ATG) company of Japan on a limited release on July 1, 1962. ATG had only begun distributing films on April 20, 1962.

The film then appeared to be acquired by Toho for wider release on June 6, 1964. The film was released in the United States in 1964 through Toho International.
