= The Ruined Map =

1967 novel by Kōbō Abe

- Cover of first American edition
- Author: Kōbō Abe
- Original title: 燃え尽きた地図; Moetsukita chizu
- Translator: E. Dale Saunders
- Language: Japanese
- Genre: Existentialism, Detective fiction
- Publisher: Shinchosha
- Publication date: 1967
- Publication place: Japan
- English publication date: 1969
- Media type: Print

The Ruined Map (燃え尽きた地図 Moetsukita chizu, 1967) is a novel by Japanese writer Kōbō Abe, translated into English by E. Dale Saunders for Knopf in 1969.

== Plot ==
The Ruined Map is the story of an unnamed detective, hired by a beautiful alcoholic woman, to find clues related to the disappearance of her husband. In the process, the detective is given a map (a ruined one), supposedly to help him, but which turns out in the end to be more like a metaphor of the guidelines one should have in life. The impossibility of finding relevant clues to help him solve the mystery leads the main character to an existential crisis, which builds slowly from the inside and finally puts him in the position of identifying himself with the man he was supposed to find.

The Ruined Map is exemplary of the postmodern detective novel, exploring themes such as urbanization, alienation, semiotic confusion, and narrative fallibility through classic elements of the noir genre. In this way, it can be read as a precursor to works like Paul Auster's New York Trilogy or Haruki Murakami's Wild Sheep Chase.

A film adaptation of the story, The Man Without a Map, was made by Hiroshi Teshigahara and released in 1968.

== Reception ==
John Leonard, writing in The New York Times, chose The Ruined Map as one of the six best novels of 1969.
