= E. Dale Saunders =

American scholar (1919–1995)

Ernest Dale Saunders (1919–1995) was an American scholar of Romance languages and literature, Japanese Buddhism, classical Japanese literature, and East Asian civilization.

== Life ==
Saunders obtained an A.B. degree from Western Reserve University in 1941 and an M.A. in Romance Philology from Harvard in 1942. He continued his studies in Japanese after joining the U.S. Naval Reserve, later earning an M.A. from Harvard in 1948 and an Doctorat de l'Université de Paris in 1953.

Saunders was a teaching fellow in Romance Languages and Literature at Harvard in 1942 and again in 1945–48. After working as instructor in French at Boston University (1946), Chargé de mission, titre étranger in the Musée Guimet in Paris (1950), Lecturer at the University of Paris (1951–52), and Assistant Professor at the International Christian University in Tokyo (1954–55), Saunders joined the faculty of the University of Pennsylvania in 1955 as assistant professor. He became associate professor in 1963 and full professor in 1968.

== Selected works ==
=== Translations ===
In addition to his contributions to scholarship, Saunders is known for his English translations of modern Japanese literature by authors such as Kōbō Abe (Inter Ice Age 4, The Woman in the Dunes, The Face of Another, The Ruined Map, and The Box Man) and Yukio Mishima (The Temple of Dawn in conjunction with Cecilia Segawa Seigle).

Saunders also translated several books into French, including the three-volume A History of Japanese Literature: From the Manyoshu to Modern Times by Shūichi Katō and Le jeu de l'indulgence: Etude de psychologie fondée sur le concept japonais d'amae by Doi Takeo.

=== Other works ===
- Mudra: A Study of Symbolic Gestures in Japanese Buddhist Sculpture
- Mythologies of the Ancient World
- Japanese Buddhism
- Buddhism in Japan, with an outline of its origins in India, 328 pp. Philadelphia: University of Pennsylvania Press, [1964]. (Distributed in the United Kingdom by Oxford University Press)
