= Clockbug =

Fictional insect

The clockbug, or eupcaccia, is a fictional insect created by Japanese writer Kōbō Abe that figures in his 1984 novel, The Ark Sakura.

The clockbug is an insect species whose legs have atrophied, mobility being unnecessary for its existence since it lives by consuming its own feces, merely using its antennae to rotate in a counter-clockwise fashion, continuously manifesting a circular trail of excretion and ingestion. The organism's slow metabolic rate allows time for nutrients in its feces to be replenished by bacterial action. It eats from dawn until sunset and sleeps through the night, and since it is heliotropic – with its head always pointing towards the Sun – it also functions as a timepiece.

The protagonist of The Ark Sakura, known as Pig (though preferring to be called Mole), identifies with the clockbug and marvels at the resemblance he sees between himself and the insect. At one point he remarks:

I believe that the eupcaccia is symbolic of a certain philosophy or way of life. However much you may move around, as long as the motion is circular you haven't really gone anywhere; the important thing is to maintain a tranquil inner core.

The clockbug's variant name, eupcaccia, suggests a combination of the prefix eu-, meaning good and the Italian word caccia, meaning hunt, in other words, good hunting. The name also suggests a combination of caccia and eupeptic, meaning having good digestion and cheerful, optimistic. Considerable irony follows from the latter suggestion, as Pig/Mole is a paranoid survivalist who has built and inhabits an enormous nuclear fallout shelter in an abandoned quarry.
