= Kazuko Yoshiyuki =

Japanese actress (1935–2025)

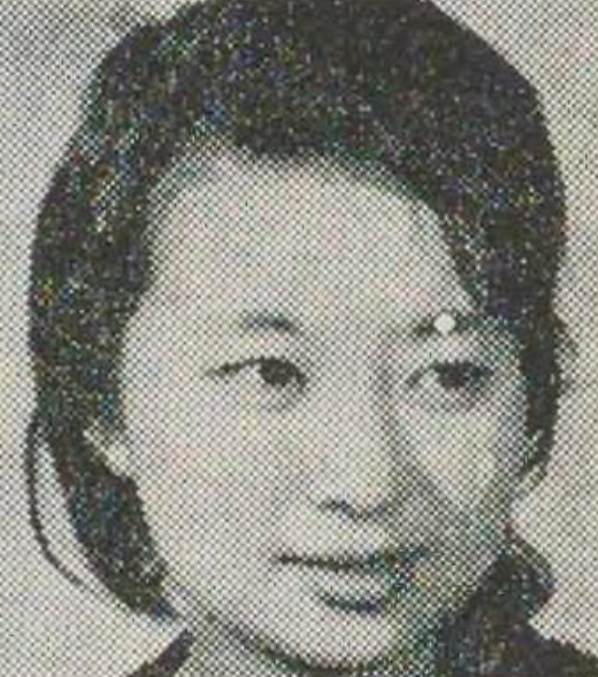
- Yoshiyuki in 1962
- Born: 9 August 1935; Tokyo, Empire of Japan (Now Japan)
- Died: 2 September 2025 (aged 90); Tokyo, Japan
- Occupation: Actress
- Years active: 1955–2025
- Parent(s): Eisuke Yoshiyuki; Aguri Yoshiyuki
- Relatives: Junnosuke Yoshiyuki (brother); Rie Yoshiyuki (sister)

Kazuko Yoshiyuki (吉行和子, Yoshiyuki Kazuko; 9 August 1935 – 2 September 2025) was a Japanese actress, voice actress, and essayist. Having grown up with the burgeoning Japanese film and TV industry during post-war period, her career bridged traditional storytelling with modern cinematic expressions, making her a quintessential figure of her era in Japanese entertainment.

She made her debut on the screen in 1955, appearing in more than 60 films and hundreds of Japanese television dramas. In a career spanning seven decades, she won a Mainichi Film Award for Best Supporting Actress in 1959, as well as a Japan Academy Film & TV Prize for Best Actress for her role in the 1978 film Empire of Passion.

== Early life and education ==
Kazuko Yoshiyuki was born on 9 August 1935 in Tokyo, the second child and first daughter of Eisuke Yoshiyuki (1906-1940), a Japanese writer, and Aguri Yoshiyuki (1907-2015), a Japanese hairdresser from a literary family. She had three siblings: her oldest brother, Junnosuke Yoshiyuki (1924-1994), a Japanese writer, and her youngest sister, Rie Yoshiyuki (1939-2006), a Japanese poet and writer. The family was from Okayama. Unfortunately, her maternal grandfather and aunt both died from Spanish flu pandemic (1918-1920), just before she was born. Also, in July 1940 when she was 4 or 5, her father Eisuke died suddenly from complications of angina pectoris at the age of 34. Like her mother, Yoshiyuki suffered from asthma from the age of two; she was frequently taken as a child to Okayama, where her grandparents lived, for a change of air. When she was 10 years old, Yoshiyuki and her family survived the advancing firebombs during World War II and lived in Tokyo throughout the war.

In March 1948, at age 13, Yoshiyuki graduated from Bancho Elementary School in Chiyoda Ward, and in 1954, at age 19, she graduated from Joshigakuen Girls High school in Tokyo. Before graduating, she took the entrance exam for Mizushina Institute attached to Mingei Theatre Company. She had no intention of becoming an actress at that point, but, being good at drawing and sewing, she applied hoping to become a costume designer.

== Career ==
In 1955, at age 20, Yoshiyuki started her career as an actress with the theatre troupe Gekidan Mingei. That same year, she made her screen debut in Yukiko, starring Keiko Tsushima (1926-2012). In 1957, Yoshiyuki made her leading role debut as Anne Frank in The Diary of Anne Frank, but after that she was only cast in modest "peasant girl" roles. In 1959, still affiliated with Mingei, Yoshiyuki signed with Nikkatsu. In the same year, she won a Mainichi Film Award for Best Supporting Actress for her performances in Nianchan and Sainou Kishitsu.

In the early 1960s, Yoshiyuki appeared in three films, as a factory worker in Foundry Town (1962), Chisako Kayama in Black Straits and Yamaguchi in Father and Daughter Song (both in 1965). In 1966, she appeared in two films, as Sophie in Junji Kinoshita's A Japanese Called Otto and Yasuko Sakai in Mountains of the Heart. In 1969, at age 33 or 34, Yoshiyuki left the company and became a freelancer.

In the early 1970s, Yoshiyuki appeared in 11 major films, in such roles as Sachiko Igarashi in Modern Chivalry Brothers (1970), Mieko Tajima in Re-Armed Gang of Yazuka and Professor Motohashi in I Can Hear My Dad's Voice (both in 1971), Yasuko in Cornered (1972), Aya Tokunaga in Lady Snowblood: Love Song of Vengeance (1974), Head Nurse Noda in Will White Girl (1976), Fusa Hirai in Days Not Returning (1978), Yue Mori in Golden Partner and Masa Takada in God's Baby (both in 1979), and Azuma Michi in Young Wife and Ayako's mother in Father and Mother! (both in 1980).

In 1974, Yoshiyuki won a Kinokuniya Theater Award Individual Prize for her role in The Taste of Honey at Shiki Theatre Company in Tokyo.

In 1978, Yoshiyuki surprised the world with her starring role as Seki in Nagisa Oshima's film Empire of Passion, a bold sexual drama, despite criticism for being over 40 years old at the time; for this she won a Japan Academy Film & TV Prize for Best Actress.

In early 1980s and 1990s, Yoshiyuki appeared in numerous films, such as Oshizu in Inside the Storehouse (1981), Suzuki Fusako in To Asuka, and to the Child, I Have Yet to Meet (1982), Toshie in Mosquito on the Tenth Floor and Bar Girl in Double Bed (both in 1983), Kazuko Yamaguchi in Colorful River (1984), Kimiyo Kitano in Love and Departure (1985), Tae in A Dog's Death and Saki's Mother in Snow in the Fields, Mountains, and Sea (both in 1986), Harumi in Make-up (1987), Miho Wagu in Yushun ORACION (1988), Mariko Maeno's mother in Chizuko's Younger Sister (1991), Yoshiko Sasaki in Hold Me and Kiss Me (1992), Nishime Kana in Himeyuri Tower and Yasuko Eguchi in Sleeping Beauty (both in 1995), Kanako Tanaka in It's a Good Day, and I'm Sorry For Your Loss (1996), Mizukashizuko in Unhappy Fruit and Hikage Sachiko in Seven Flowing Planners (both in 1997), and Masao's grandmother in Kikujiro and Matsu in Taboo (both in 1999).

Yoshiyuki appeared in four NHK General TV series, such as her portrayal of Masako Hirayama in Aguri (1997), Chiyo Tamaki in Tsubasa (2009), Tora Uno/Narrator in Gochisousan (2013), and Masako Komukai in The Sniffer (2016-2018). In addition to Japanese television dramas, she was also an actively storyteller on children's TV program Okaasan to Issho (since 1959).

In 2002, Yoshiyuki was given the Kinuyo Tanaka at the Mainichi Film Awards for her work on Oriume and other films.

She also voiced Toki in Ponyo (2008) and Nanny in When Marnie Was There (2014).

Yoshiyuki's last film and television projects included her posthumous appearance in Fumiko Kaneko: Because I Wanted to, released in February 2026, just one year after her death.

== Personal life ==
Yoshiyuki never married, and did not have children, though she expressed openness to marriage and being a mother. After her father's death, her mother Aguri influenced her views, making her value independence and responsibility. She said: "My mother, Aguri, was extremely dexterous from an early age. She would make kimonos for dolls, and knit. She was very good at making things."

Yoshiyuki stayed focused on her career and experiences like travel, and often spoken about enjoying singlehood until her death.

=== Views ===
Yoshiyuki was raised in Buddhism and Shinto. She was known for her political and social views, such as opposing the War on Terror including Iraq War (2003–2011), and supporting efforts to combat climate change. Yoshiyuki said in a television interview: I really think that there are a lot of idiots in the world. They know it will make everyone unhappy, but there must be someone who benefits from it. She was proud of being an anti-war person in wartime.

== Health problems and death ==
In 2022, Yoshiyuki was diagnosed with dementia, but she remained active throughout her life, continuing to work well into her later years.

Yoshiyuki died of pneumonia, at a hospital in Tokyo, on 2 September 2025, at the age of 90. Her death was announced by her agency a week later. Her private funeral was held only in the presence of close relatives.

== Selected filmography ==
=== Film ===
- My Second Brother (1959) – as Kanako Hori
- Foundry Town (1962) – as a factory worker
- Black Straits (1965) – as Chisako Kayama
- Father and Daughter Song (1965) – as Yamaguchi
- A Japanese Called Otto (1966) – as Sophie
- Mountains of the Heart (1966) – as Yasuko Sakai
- Modern Chivalry Brothers (1970) – as Sachiko Igarashi
- Re-Armed Gang of Yazuka (1971) – as Mieko Tajima
- I Can Hear My Dad's Voice (1971) – as Professor Motohashi
- Cornered (1972) – as Yasuko
- Lady Snowblood: Love Song of Vengeance (1974) – as Aya Tokunaga
- Will White Girl (1976) – as Head Nurse Noda
- Empire of Passion (1978) – as Seki
- Days Not Returning (1978) – as Fusa Hirai
- Golden Partner (1979) – as Yue Mori
- God's Baby (1979) – as Masa Takada
- Young Wife (1980) – as Azuma Michi
- Father and Mother! (1980) – as Ayako's mother
- Hot Sleep of Beasts (1981) - as Trainer
- Inside the Storehouse (1981) – as Oshizu
- To Asuka, and to the Child, I Have Yet to Meet (1982) – as Suzuki Fusako
- Woman 6th Street Honey Taste (1982) – as Fukiko
- Crossing Amagi (1983) – as Kenzo Onodera's mother
- Mosquito on the Tenth Floor (1983) — as Toshie
- Double Bed (1983) – as Bar Girl
- Colorful River (1984) – as Kazuko Yamaguchi
- Love and Departure (1985) – as Kimiyo Kitano
- A Dog's Death (1986) – as Tae
- Blackboard (1986) – as Japanese housewife, who walking with her dog (discovered of body)
- Snow in the Fields, Mountains, and Sea (1986) – as Saki's Mother
- Setouchi Boys Baseball Team: The Last Paradise (1987) – as Hana
- Make-up (1987) – as Harumi
- Eternal Half (1987) – as My Mother
- Yushun ORACION (1988) – as Miho Wagu
- Chizuko's Younger Sister (1991) – as Mariko Maeno's mother
- Hold Me and Kiss Me (1992) – as Yoshiko Sasaki
- Himeyuri Tower (1995) – as Nishime Kana
- Sleeping Beauty (1995) – as Yasuko Eguchi
- It's a Good Day, and I'm Sorry For Your Loss (1996) – as Kanako Tanaka
- Unhappy Fruit (1997) – as Mizukashizuko
- Seven Flowing Planners (1997) - Hikage Sachiko
- Kikujiro (1999) – as Masao's grandmother
- Taboo (1999) – as Omatsu
- Lily Festival (2001) – as Rie Miyano
- Tsuribaka Nisshi 15 (2004) – as Nobuko Fukumoto
- J-Horror Theater Yogen (2004) – as Satoko Mikoshiba
- Kamataki (2005) – as Kariya Sensei
- Wool 100% (2006) – as Kame
- Maiko Haaaan!!! (2007) – as Satsuki
- Glory to the Filmmaker! (2007)
- Ponyo (2008) – as Toki (voice)
- Cyborg She (2008) – as the grandmother of Jiro
- Departures (2008) – as Tsuyako Yamashita
- 20th Century Boys (2008) – as mother of Moroboshi
- Koitanibashi (2011)
- Yuriko, Dasvidaniya (2011) – as Yoshie Chujyo
- The Love and Death of Kaoru Mitarai (2013) – as Kaoru Mitarai
- Tokyo Family (2013) – as Tomiko Hirayama
- The Little House (2014) – Mrs. Konaka
- When Marnie Was There (2014) – as Nanny (voice)
- The Firefly Summers (2016)
- The Book Peddler (2016) – as Tome Miyoshi
- What a Wonderful Family! (2016)
- What a Wonderful Family! 2 (2017)
- Miracles of the Namiya General Store (2017)
- Ajin: Demi-Human (2017) – as Yamanaka
- Destiny: The Tale of Kamakura (2017)
- What a Wonderful Family! 3: My Wife, My Life (2018)
- A Forest of Wool and Steel (2018) – as Kiyo Tomura
- The Landlady (2019)
- Photograph of Memories (2021)
- The Cinematic Liars of Asahi-za (2021) – as Hideko Matsuyama
- Somebody's Flowers (2022)
- Life in Bloom (2022)
- Yudo: The Way of the Bath (2023)
- Ai no Komuragaeri (2023)
- Push Pause (2024)
- Kaneko Fumiko: Because I Wanted to (2026)
- The Hikikomori Extraction (2026)
- Diamonds in the Sand (2027, released posthumously)

=== Television ===
- Kaze to Kumo to Niji to (1976) – as Kera
- Tokugawa Ieyasu (1983) – as Nene
- Aguri (1997) – as Masako Hirayama
- Tsubasa (2009) – as Chiyo Tamaki
- Gochisousan (2013) – as Tora Uno/Narrator
- The Sniffer (2016-2018) – as Masako Komukai

== Honors ==
- Kinuyo Tanaka Award (2002)
