= Rie Yoshiyuki =

Japanese writer (1939–2006)

- 吉行理恵
- Born: Rieko Yoshiyuki; 8 July 1939; Tokyo, Japan
- Died: 4 May 2006 (aged 66); Tokyo, Japan
- Education: Waseda University
- Occupation: Writer
- Relatives: Eisuke Yoshiyuki; Junnosuke Yoshiyuki; Kazuko Yoshiyuki
- Writing career
- Language: Japanese
- Notable works: Yume no naka de; Mahōtsukai no Kushan Neko; Chiisana Kifujin; Kiiroi Neko
- Notable awards: Noma Children's Literature Newcomer Award; Women's Literature Prize; Akutagawa Prize

Rie Yoshiyuki (吉行理恵, Yoshiyuki Rie; 8 July 1939 – 4 May 2006) was a Japanese writer of short stories, novels and poetry. She was awarded the Noma Children's Literature Newcomer Award, the Akutagawa Prize, and the Women's Literature Prize.

== Biography ==
Yoshiyuki was born in Tokyo as the third child of writer Eisuke Yoshiyuki and his wife Aguri, a prominent beautician. She graduated from the department of Japanese literature at Waseda University in 1961.

Her first poetry collection titled Aoi Heya (青い部屋; lit. "Blue room") was published in 1963. Her 1967 poetry collection Yume no naka de (夢の中で; lit. "In a dream") won her the Tamura Toshiko Prize. In 1973, she published her short story Kioku no naka ni (記憶のなかに; lit. "In my recollections") about her father, who had died when she was only one year old. A collection of short stories titled Otoko girai (男嫌い; lit. "Hate of men") followed in 1975.

Her children's story Mahōtsukai no kushan neko (まほうつかいのくしゃんねこ; lit. "Sneezing cat, a magician", 1971) won her the Noma Children's Literature Newcomer Award. Other prize-winning works include Chiisana Kifujin (小さな貴婦人; The Little Lady, 1981) and Kiiroi neko (黄色い猫; lit. "Yellow cat", 1988). Many of her stories have cats as characters or describe relationships between cats and humans, or draw upon childhood memories. Another recurring theme is the way people's cruel behaviour affects the lives of others.

Yoshiyuki died in Tokyo on 4 May 2006 of thyroid cancer.

Her older brother Junnosuke was also a novelist, and her older sister Kazuko is an actress.

== Selected works ==
- 1963: Aoi Heya (poetry collection)
- 1967: Yume no naka de (poetry collection)
- 1971: Mahōtsukai no kushan neko
- 1972: Kumo no iru sora
- 1973: Kioku no naka ni
- 1973: Senaka no neko
- 1975: Otoko girai (short story collection)
- 1981: The Little Lady (short story collection)
- 1981: Ido no hoshi (short story collection)
- 1982: Meiro no futago
- 1983: Tooka no tsubomi
- 1983: Haioku no hime-gimi
- 1987: Hana kagami
- 1988: Kiiroi neko (short story collection)

== Translations ==
Only few of Yoshiyuki's writings have been translated into English, these include her poems Carrying and Sacrificial Victim, and the short story The Little Lady. Her short story Ido no hoshi (井戸の星, lit. "Stars in the well") was translated into German as Im Brunnen die Sterne.

== Awards ==
- 1967: Tamura Toshiko Prize for Yume no naka de
- 1970: 9th Noma Children's Literature Newcomer Award for Mahōtsukai no kushan neko
- 1981: 85th Akutagawa Prize for The Little Lady
- 1989: 28th Women's Literature Prize for Kiiroi neko
