= Kangaroo Notebook =

Novel by Kobo Abe published in 1991

- English translation first edition cover
- Author: Kōbō Abe
- Original title: カンガルー・ノート (Kangarū Nōto)
- Translator: Maryellen Toman Mori
- Language: Japanese
- Genre: Absurdist fiction
- Publisher: Alfred A Knopf
- Publication date: ca 1977 (Eng. trans. April 1996)
- Publication place: Japan
- Media type: Print (Hardback & Paperback)
- Pages: 183 pp (Eng. trans. first edition, hardback)
- ISBN: 0-679-42412-1 (Eng. trans. first edition, hardback)

Kangaroo Notebook (カンガルー・ノート, Kangarū Nōto) is a novel written by the Japanese writer Kōbō Abe between ca. 1973 – 1977 and published in 1991.

== Plot summary ==
One morning, while pondering the stress of his latest assignment at his uninspiring job, the narrator of Kangaroo Notebook feels an itching on his leg that seems to indicate an unusual hair loss. The next morning he wakes to discover that he has daikon radish sprouts emerging from his shins. After battling to be seen in his local medical clinic, he enters a hospital, where a physician prescribes hot-spring therapy in Hell Valley.

Hooked to a penile catheter and an IV bottle, the narrator begins a harrowing journey on his hospital bed through the underworld that seems to lie beneath the city streets. Here he seeks, not so much health, as simple explanations for what is happening to him and the strange people he meets: abusive ferrymen, waif-like demons, vampire nurses, and a chiropractor who runs a karate school and has a side job carrying out euthanasia procedures.
