= Antonio Gaudi (film) =

Antonio Gaudí
- Directed by: Hiroshi Teshigahara
- Starring: Antoni Gaudí
- Release date: 1984
- Running time: 72 minutes
- Country: Japan

Antonio Gaudí (アントニー・ガウディー) is a 1984 Japanese documentary film by Hiroshi Teshigahara about the works of Antoni Gaudí. In the film the director visits the buildings including houses in Barcelona and the Sagrada Família.

== Reception ==
The Village Voice wrote: "Something of a passion project, completed decades after an earlier visit by the director, the film is given over to an eager, rolling catalog of Gaudí's fin-de-siècle works sans much voiceover or any explanatory text. ... Toru Takemitsu’s partly electronic score mostly harps on the otherworldliness of it all, while Teshigahara’s shifting editing rhythms forestall outright contemplation."

In The New York Times, critic Stephen Holden wrote: "Much of the imagery in Gaudí is nothing less than astounding in its beauty and boldness, and the blending of a neo-Gothic mysticism and grandeur with an Art Nouveau line and a surreal apprehension of the power of nature".

== See also ==
- List of Gaudí buildings
