= Kisaku Itō =

Japanese art director (1899–1967)

- Born: 1 August 1899; Tokyo
- Died: 31 March 1967 (aged 67)
- Occupation: Art Director
- Awards: Mainichi Film Award for Best Art Direction

Kisaku Itō (伊藤 熹朔, Itō Kisaku, 1 August 1899 – 31 March 1967) was a Japanese art director.

He was born in Tokyo. He developed a skill in drawing, and became among the most prominent set designers in Japanese cinema following World War II.

He won the Mainichi Film Award for Best Art Direction for the 1953 film Ugetsu. In 1955, he served as art director for She Was Like a Wild Chrysanthemum.

== Selected filmography ==
- Typhoon Over Nagasaki (1957)
