= The Ark Sakura =

1984 novel by Kōbō Abe

- Author: Kōbō Abe
- Original title: 方舟さくら丸; Hakobune Sakura-maru
- Translator: Juliet Winters Carpenter
- Language: Japanese
- Publication date: 1984
- Publication place: Japan
- Media type: Print

The Ark Sakura (方舟さくら丸 Hakobune Sakura-maru) is a novel by the Japanese novelist Kōbō Abe. The novel's protagonist is a recluse who, convinced that the world will end soon, takes up residence in an abandoned mine and then attempts to sell tickets to his "ark" to people he deems worthy of saving from the apocalypse. The novel was originally published in 1984; the English translation by Juliet Winters Carpenter was released in 1988.

== Plot summary ==
The novel begins with the protagonist, who calls himself Mole, going to a flea market in order to find people to live aboard his "ark," an abandoned mine that he has outfitted so that it will withstand the nuclear holocaust that he predicts is imminent. His eye is caught by a man selling insects called clockbugs. The insect dealer has two shills, or sakura as they are known in Japanese, working for him, one an aggressive, impulsive young man, and the other a sly but attractive woman. When Mole offers the insect dealer a ticket aboard his ark, it is stolen by the shills. After chasing the pair of them back to the ark, Mole and the insect dealer discover that the shills are not the only intruders: other unseen, unwelcome people have been prowling the dark corridors as well. Mole comes to accept the presence of the two shills in exchange for their help in repelling the intruders. But his fantasy of having power over the other residents of the "ark" unwinds as matters become more and more complex. As a brigade of old men, a band of school girls, and a group of wayward youths all come to occupy the hull of the "ark," Mole is forced to abandon his creation, his sanctum breached and his heart broken by the female sakura who rejects his advances.

== Style ==
In his review of the novel for The New York Times, Edmund White described The Ark Sakura as dreamlike "in the strictest sense," praising its scope and the level of detail of the novel. The novel delves deep into the strange ideas and predilection of its narrator. But it also serves as a haunting exploration of modern life in Japan and what it means to be an outcast.
