= Wool 100% =

- Directed by: Mai Tominaga
- Written by: Mai Tominaga
- Produced by: Masahiro Harada; Kazuhiko Yusa
- Starring: Kyōko Kishida; Kazuko Yoshiyuki; Ayu Kitaura
- Cinematography: Satoshi Seno
- Edited by: Katsuishi Nagashima
- Music by: Hiroyasu Yaguchi
- Production companies: The Klock Worx Company; Pyramid Film; Sojitz Corporation
- Distributed by: The Klock Worx Company (Japan); Cinema Epoch (United States)
- Release dates: 28 October 2006 (Tokyo); 12 September 2007 (New York City)
- Running time: 100 minutes
- Country: Japan
- Language: Japanese

Wool 100% (Japanese: ウール100%) is a 2006 Japanese comedy-fantasy film directed by Mai Tominaga. It was released on October 28, 2006 in Japan and had a United States release on September 12, 2007. The film stars Kyōko Kishida and Kazuko Yoshiyuki as two elderly sisters who discover a mysterious young girl in their house who continually knits a red sweater, leading them to name her "Knit-again" (Aminaoshi).

== Synopsis ==
Elderly sisters Ume (Kyōko Kishida) and Kame (Kazuko Yoshiyuki) spend their days dumpster diving in order to find various "treasures" that they haul back to their house, which is full of the various objects that they have collected over the years. One day they discover a skein of red yarn, which prompts the appearance of Aminaoshi (Ayu Kitaura), a strange young girl that uses the yarn to repeatedly knit and then unravel a red sweater. They try to get her to leave, only for her to refuse and try to damage things in the house.

The two sisters let her stay, but her presence brings back memories of a door-to-door junk dealer that they had both become infatuated with, before he left to fight in World War II. He never returned, but Ume and Kame kept hope that he would return and collected various bits of trash in preparation for when he comes back. Through Aminaoshi, the two sisters eventually come to terms with the fact that the junk dealer will not return.

== Cast ==
- Kyōko Kishida as Ume
- Kazuko Yoshiyuki as Kame
- Ayu Kitaura as Aminaoshi
- Eiko Koike - Narration (voice)

== Reception ==
Critical reception for Wool 100% has been mostly positive and the film holds a rating of 100% on Rotten Tomatoes based upon 5 reviews. Film Threat gave a mostly positive review, citing the acting of Kishida and Yoshiyuki as a highlight and expressing hope that "Tominaga will bring these characters for further adventures." Variety gave an overall positive review but commented that "Thesping is stiff, as is helming, which suggests Tominaga, who is predominantly an animator, is unaccustomed to actors and has not yet established a comfortable directorial rhythm." A reviewer for DVD Talk noted that not all viewers would like the film but that "while we're tuned into its wavelength, Wool 100% is wonderful."

=== Awards ===
- Prix Sequences Award at the Fantasia Festival (2007, won)
