= Inter Ice Age 4 =

1959 novel by Kobo Abe

- Cover of 1st Japanese edition
- Author: Kōbō Abe
- Original title: 第四間氷期; Dai-Yon Kampyōki
- Translator: E. Dale Saunders
- Illustrator: Abe Machi
- Language: Japanese
- Genre: Science fiction
- Publisher: Kodansha
- Publication date: 1959
- Publication place: Japan
- English publication date: 1970
- Media type: Print

Inter Ice Age 4 (第四間氷期, Dai-Yon Kampyōki) is an early science fiction novel by Japanese writer Kōbō Abe originally serialized in the journal Sekai from 1958 to 1959. In 1970 the book became the first Japanese science fiction novel to appear in English, in a translation by American scholar E. Dale Saunders.

== Plot summary ==
In the third edition of The Encyclopedia of Science Fiction, author and critic John Clute writes of Inter Ice Age 4: "It is a complex story set in a near-future Japan threatened by the melting polar ice caps. The protagonist, Professor Katsumi, has been in charge of developing a computer/information system capable of predicting human behavior. Fatally for him, this system predicts his compulsive refusal to go along with his associates and his government in the creation of genetically engineered children, adapted for life in the rising seas. Most of the novel, narrated by Katsumi, deals with a philosophical confrontation between his deeply alienated refusal of the future and the computer's knowing representations of that refusal and the alternatives to it. The resulting psychodramas include a mysterious murder and the enlistment of his unborn child into the ranks of the mutated water-breathers."

Plot elements include: submersion of the world caused by melting polar ice, genetic creation of gilled children for the coming underwater age, and a fortune-telling computer predicting the future and advising humans how to deal with it. Because a similar computer in Moscow is being used to make political forecasts, the institute of a Tokyo professor decides to avoid politics and try to foresee the future of an individual. A man is picked, apparently at random, only to be murdered before he can be programmed, but the computer can still read his mind. The resulting involvements are complicated by a climatic shift – Inter Ice Age 4 – that puts Earth underwater.

== Literary significance ==
In his Visual Encyclopedia of Science Fiction, British author and critic Brian Ash calls the English translation of the novel "flat" and "featureless", but notes that this "could not smother the miracle of [Abe's] use of biology to attack racism at its very root, asking what will be our attitudes to those whom we ourselves design for life in alien habitats?"

Scholar Robert L. Trent writes of the novel's themes: "Genetic engineering succeeds in creating an aquatic human, but people feel the sapping of their own sense of identity as people, since after the flood, only the aquatic humans will be 'people'. As one can see, the crisis of alienation and the crisis of identity are great concerns of Abe Kobo."

In his introduction to a pair of Abe's essays published in the November, 2002 issue of Science Fiction Studies, Christopher Bolton writes: "Abe's work in the 1950s included short stories about robots, suspended animation, and alien visitation, but it was the 1959 publication of his novel Dai yon kanpyôki (Inter Ice Age 4, 1970) that marked a real turning point for SF in Japan. Incorporating hard-science elements on a scale that no Japanese novelist had attempted, Abe nevertheless pushed the story toward a disturbing, almost surreal conclusion. A number of critics have identified Inter Ice Age 4 as Japan's first full-length science fiction novel, and a work that helped jump start Japanese interest in the genre."

A Companion to Crime Fiction describes Inter Ice Age 4 as a 'metaphysical detective story', comparing it with Andrew Crumey's Mobius Dick and Haruki Murakami's Hard-Boiled Wonderland and the End of the World, 'linking apocalyptic science fiction and metaphysical detective/mystery stories through antiphonal narratives, alternating "science" and "mystery" to yield reciprocal modes of displacement.'

Inter Ice Age 4 was the first Japanese science fiction novel to be translated into English, in a 1970 translation by American scholar E. Dale Saunders.
