= The Box Man (film) =

2024 Japanese film by Gakuryū Ishii

- Theatrical release poster
- Kanji: 箱男
- Literal meaning: Box Man
- Romanization: Hako Otoko
- Directed by: Gakuryū Ishii
- Screenplay by: Kiyotaka Inagaki; Gakuryu Ishii
- Based on: The Box Man by Kōbō Abe
- Produced by: Keisuke Konishi; Tomohiko Seki
- Starring: Masatoshi Nagase; Tadanobu Asano; Koichi Sato
- Cinematography: Hideho Urata
- Edited by: Banri Nagase
- Music by: Michiaki Katsumoto
- Production companies: Happinet Phantom Studios; cogitoworks
- Distributed by: Happinet Phantom Studios
- Release date: 17 February 2024 (Berlinale)
- Running time: 120 minutes
- Country: Japan
- Language: Japanese

The Box Man (Japanese: 箱男) is a 2024 Japanese drama film directed by Gakuryū Ishii. The film is adaptation of a 1973 homonymous novel by the Japanese author Kōbō Abe. It is surreal story in which a cardboard box becomes the perfect shell for men who want to withdraw from society, and gaze without being seen.

It was selected in the Berlinale Special at the 74th Berlin International Film Festival, where it had its world premiere on 17 February 2024.

== Synopsis ==
In the bustling streets of Tokyo, a peculiar man dons a cardboard box over his head. Through a small peephole, he observes the world and diligently records his observations in a notebook. The photographer, known as "Myself" encounters this enigmatic figure and becomes captivated by his unconventional existence. Inspired, Myself embarks on a similar journey, aiming to become a "Box Man" like the mysterious stranger. However, the path is fraught with challenges: a deceptive doctor, a cunning military man, and an alluring woman who tempts him. Can Myself achieve his dream of fully embracing the box man's identity?

== Cast ==
- Masatoshi Nagase as "Myself"
- Tadanobu Asano as Fake Doctor
- Koichi Sato as General
- Ayana Shiramoto as Yoko
- Yūko Nakamura as Detective
- Kiyohiko Shibukawa as Badge-wearing Beggar

== Production ==
In 1997, Ishii obtained the consent of the author Kōbō Abe to make film on his novel The Box Man. In 2024, coincidentally the 100th anniversary of Kobo Abe's birth, Gakuryu Ishii finally made the film adaptation of the novel. Masatoshi Nagase, who was chosen to play "Myself" 27 years ago is in the lead role. Koichi Sato was also chosen to appear 27 years ago is cast now. The film went into production in Hamburg/ Studio Bendestorf/ Germany in 1997 . Funding collapsed so that 'The Boxman' with its current release has a total of 27 years timeline from script to screen.

The film is produced by Happinet Phantom Studios and Cogitoworks, with Happinet Phantom Studios also handling the distribution in Japan. Filming began in the summer of 2023 in Japan.

== Release ==
The Box Man had its world premiere on 17 February 2024, as part of the 74th Berlin International Film Festival, in Berlinale Special.

== Reception ==
Lida Bach reviewing in Movie Break rated the film 6.5/10 and wrote, "A box, far from being a dead end, is an entrance to another world, so Gakuryū Ishii draws the audience of his Kafkaesque adaptation of Kōbō Abe's underground classic into a psychological labyrinth of fetish, fixation and voyeurism and integrates them into the surreal scenario as observers in their own cinema box."

== Accolades ==
Award	Ceremony date	Category	Recipient(s)	Result	Ref.
Mainichi Film Awards	17 January 2025	Mainichi Film Award for Best Art Direction	Yūji Hayashida	Won	
Asian Film Awards	16 March 2025	Best Original Music	Michiaki Katsumoto	Nominated	
Asian Film Awards	16 March 2025	Best Production Design	Hayashida Yuji	Nominated	
