= Beasts Head for Home =

1957 novel by Kōbō Abe

- Cover of the first Japanese edition
- Author: Kōbō Abe
- Original title: けものたちは故郷をめざす; Kemono tachi wa kokyou wo mezasu
- Translator: Richard F. Calichman
- Language: Japanese
- Genre: Fiction & Literature
- Publisher: Columbia University Press
- Publication date: 1957
- Publication place: Japan
- English publication date: 2017
- Media type: Print
- Pages: 224 [US ed.]
- ISBN: 9780231177047
- OCLC: 969199237
- Dewey Decimal: 895.63/5
- LC Class: PL845.B4 K413 2017
- Website: Beasts Head for Home at CUP

Beasts Head for Home (けものたちは故郷をめざす, Kemono tachi wa kokyou wo mezasu, 1957) is an early autobiographical novel by Japanese writer Kōbō Abe. It was translated into English, with an introduction, by Richard F. Calichman for Columbia University Press in 2017 as part of the Weatherhead Books on Asia series.

The books is divided into four chapters: "The Rusted Tracks," "The Flag," "The Trap," and "Doors."

== Background ==
After the end of the Second World War in 1946, Abe decided to return to Japan from Mukden in Manchuria after his business went bankrupt. When evidence of cholera was found on board the ship home, it was barred from port and quarantined for ten days. Being so close to home, yet unable to disembark, many of the passengers began to exhibit signs of insanity in much the same way as the main character does at the end of the novel. It was this experience, at least in part, that served as the inspiration for Beasts.

== Plot ==
The story concerns a Japanese adolescent named Kiku Kyuzo, an orphan living in Manchuria at the end of the Japanese occupation in 1945, who attempts to make his way back to his ancestral homeland, a country he has never known. Soviet forces have arrived in Manchuria, and most of the Japanese civilians living there have already fled, but Kyuzo stays behind to care for his ailing mother. After her death, Kyuzo becomes the charge of two Soviet soldiers, who treat him well but will not allow him to leave. At the onset of the Chinese Civil War, the Red Army withdraws, and Kyuzo is finally able to begin the long journey south that he hopes will lead to his repatriation in Japan.

== Reception ==
Kirkus Reviews describes the novel as "a memorable portrait of statelessness, exile, and wandering." In the Asian Review of Books, Peter Gordon writes "Beasts Head for Home is as riveting and as unforgiving as the frigid Civil War wilderness in which it is set," praises Calichman's translation, but finds his introduction to be "overly complex for the lay reader." The Memphis Flyer finds Beasts to be a "good novel," but "a preparation for the greater novels to come."
