= Cold Song =

Cold Song may refer to:

- "What Power Art Thou?", informally also known as "The Cold Song", an aria from the 17th-century opera King Arthur
- "The Cold Song", a track from the 1981 Klaus Nomi album Klaus Nomi based on the aria
- "Cold Song", a track from the 1995 Jewel album Pieces of You
- "Cold Song", a 1996 single by German house music project Whirlpool Productions
- "Cold Song", a 2013 single by Arielle Dombasle
- "Cold Song", a track from the 2018 Good Charlotte album Generation Rx and its early working title
- "Cold Song", a track from the 2021 Susumu Hirasawa album Beacon
- The Cold Song, a 2011 novel by Linn Ullmann

== See also ==
- Cold (disambiguation) § Songs
- Winter Song (disambiguation)
