= The Face of Another =

1964 novel by Kobo Abe

- Author: Kōbō Abe
- Original title: 他人の顔; Tanin no kao
- Translator: E. Dale Saunders
- Illustrator: Robert Steele Wallace [US ed.]
- Language: Japanese
- Publisher: Kodansha
- Publication date: 1964
- Publication place: Japan
- English publication date: 1966
- Media type: Print
- Pages: 387 [Japanese ed.]

The Face of Another (Japanese: 他人の顔, Hepburn: Tanin no kao) is a 1964 novel written by the Japanese novelist Kōbō Abe. Like other stories written by this author, the novel explores the alienation of modern man from urban society. It is written in the first person narrative mode, and is divided into a prologue, three "notebooks" (black, gray, and white), and a concluding letter from the protagonist's wife. In 1966, it was adapted into a film directed by Hiroshi Teshigahara.

== Synopsis ==
An industrial accident has severely burned the face of an unnamed plastics scientist. His wife is repulsed by his disfigurement and refuses to have sexual contact with him. In an effort to regain the affection of his wife, he attempts to create a prosthetic mask in a rented apartment. With this new "face," the protagonist sees the world in a new way and begins a clandestine affair with his estranged wife. Although the mask gives the man newfound freedom, at the end of the story, it becomes difficult to determine if the mask has taken ownership of the man or the man has taken ownership of the face.

There is also a subplot following a hibakusha woman who has suffered burns to the right side of her face. In the novel, the protagonist sees this character in a film; in the film version, this is deliberately obscured.

== Reception ==
An anonymous reviewer at Kirkus Reviews writes: "Abe's symbolic pantomime is not extroverted; in fact it is very ingrown; but it toys with images and ideas in a fascinating fashion, even while at the expense of both the reader's patience and sensibility."

== See also ==
- La Belle Image by Marcel Aymé, a novel with a similar premise
