= Kyōko Kishida =

Japanese actress (1930–2006)

- 岸田 今日子
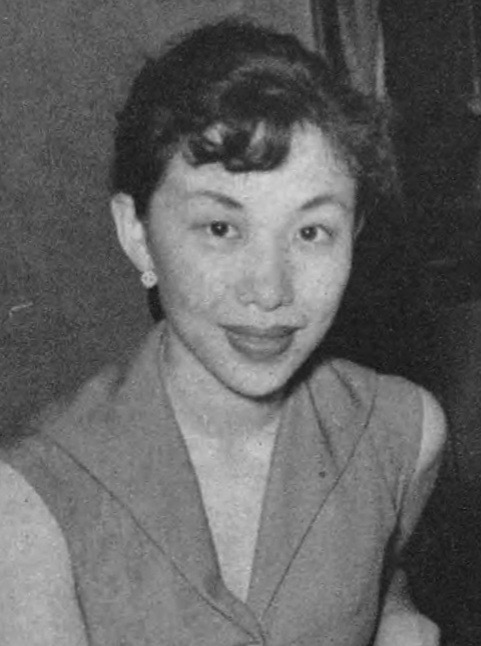
- Kyōko Kishida in 1954
- Born: 29 April 1930; Suginami, Tokyo Prefecture, Japan
- Died: 17 December 2006 (aged 76); Tokyo, Japan
- Occupations: Actress; writer
- Years active: 1950–2005
- Spouse: Noboru Nakaya (m. 1954; div. 1978)

Kyōko Kishida (岸田 今日子, Kishida Kyōko; 29 April 1930 – 17 December 2006) was a Japanese actress and writer.

== Biography ==
Kishida was born in the Tokyo Prefecture as the second daughter of playwright Kunio Kishida. Her older sister was the children's author and poet Eriko Kishida and she was cousins with actor Shin Kishida. She joined the Bungakuza theatre company in 1950, making her breakthrough in Yukio Mishima's stage production of Oscar Wilde's Salome. In 1963, she left the Bungakuza and joined the Kumo Theatre Company.

Kishida gave her film debut with a small role in Tadashi Imai's An Inlet of Muddy Water (1953). Her first leading film roles were in Hiroshi Teshigahara's Woman in the Dunes and Yasuzō Masumura's Manji (both 1964). Other film credits include Kon Ichikawa's Her Brother (1960), Yasujirō Ozu's An Autumn Afternoon (1962), Kaneto Shindō's Akuto (1965), Teshigahara's The Face of Another (1966) and Rikyu (1989), and Isao Yukisada's Spring Snow (2005), based on the Mishima novel of the same name.

She also appeared on television in various Taiga dramas such as Akō Rōshi (1979) and Takeda Shingen (1988), and performed voiceovers for anime series like Moomin (1969–70), Vampire Princess Miyu (1988) and Princess Tutu (2002–03).

Kishida was married to the actor Noboru Nakaya from 1954 to 1978. She died on 17 December 2006 in Tokyo from respiratory failure caused by a brain tumor.

== Selected filmography ==
=== Films ===
1950s

- An Inlet of Muddy Water (1953)
- Futeki na Otoko (1958), Sakie
- Akujo no Kisetsu (1958), Yoshimi Hayakawa
- Gurama-to no Yuwaku (1959), Sumiko Tsuboi
- Anyakōro (1959), prostitute

1960s

- The Twilight Story (1960), Teruko
- Nami no Tō (1960)
- Her Brother (1960), Mrs. Tanuma
- Minagoroshi no Uta yori Kenju-yo Saraba! (1960), Sally
- The Human Condition (1961), Ryuko
- Are ga Minato no Hi da (1961)
- Ten Dark Women (1961), Sayoko Goto
- Tokyo Yawa (1961), Ranko
- Ai to Honoho to (1961), geisha
- Onna wa Yogiri ni Nureteiru (1962), Yoshiko Hoshino
- The Outcast (1962), Inoko's wife
- Namida o Shishi no Tategami ni (1962), Reiko Matsudaira
- An Autumn Afternoon (1962), 'Kaoru' no Madame
- Watashi wa Nisai (1962), Chiyo's Friend
- Shinobi no Mono (1962), Inone
- Bushido, Samurai Saga (1963), Lady Hagi
- Otoko Girai (1964), Utako Takamura
- Woman in the Dunes (1964), the woman
- Le mari était là (Otto ga Mita 'Onna no Kobako' yori) (1964), Yoko Saijyo
- Konnichiwa Akachan (1964), Ms Okiyama
- Kigeki Yōki-na Mibōjin (1964)
- Aku no Monsho (1964), Mitsue Takazawa
- Manji (1964), Sonoko Kakiuchi
- Kwaidan (1964), a noblewoman (uncredited)
- Nikutai no Gakko (1965), Taeko Asano
- Akuto (1965), Kanze
- Danryu (1966), Mikie Shima
- The Face of Another (1966), Infirmière
- Ō-oku Maruhi Monogatari (1967)
- Fushin no Toki (1968), Chizuko Mochizuki
- Senya Ichiya Monogatari (1969) (voice)
- Jotai (1969), Akie

1970s

- Men and War, Part I (1970)
- Moomin (1971), Moomin (voice)
- En to iu Onna (1971)
- Men and War, Part II (1971)
- Tabi no Omosa (1972), Mama, the girl's mother
- Nosutoradamusu no Daiyogen (1974), Narrator
- Are wa Dare? (1976), voice
- Inugami-ke no Ichizoku (1976), Koto Teacher
- Utamaro: Yume to Shiriseba (1977), Ochika
- Nippon no Don: Yabohen (1977), Naoko Anekoji
- Sugata Sanshiro (1977), Omon
- Risu no Panashi (1978), voice
- Inubue (1978), narrator
- Jigoku (1979), Shima Ikegata

1980s

- Terra e... (1980), grandmother (voice)
- Rennyo to sono Haha (1981) (voice)
- Konoko no Nanatsu no Oiwai ni (1982), Mayumi
- Detective Story (1983), Kimie Hasenuma
- Seito Shokun! (1984), Michiko Hokujo
- Haru no Kane (1985), Fusako Ishimoto
- Rokumeikan (1986), Marchioness Takako
- The Sea and Poison (1986), Oba, Head Nurse
- Eiga Joyu (1987), Kuginukiya
- Seishun Kakeochi-hen (1987)
- Let's Gōtoku-ji! (1987), Miyabi Gōtokuji
- Hissatsu 4: Urami Harashimasu (1987), Benten - head of the assassins
- Yoshiwara Enjo (1987), Narrator
- Princess from the Moon (1987), Kougo
- Tsuru (1988), Kichibi
- Rikyu (1989), His wife end

1990s

- Ibara-hime matawa Nemuri hime (1990), voice
- Ten to Chi to (1991), Maid-In-Waiting
- Tenkawa Densetsu Satsujin Jiken (1991), Natsu Minakami
- Zodiac Killer (Ji dao zhui zong) (1991), Geisha Miyako
- Fusa (1993), Mura
- Gakkō no Kaidan 2 (1996), School Master
- Yatsuhaka-mura (1996), Kotake and Koume Tajimi
- Aisuru (1997), Taeko Kano

2000s

- Shinsengumi (2000), Komano (voice)
- Dora-heita (2000)
- Ningen no Kuzu (2001)
- Kuroe (2001), Cleaning Lady
- Sukedachi-ya Sukeroku (2001), Otome
- Sennen no koi - Hikaru Genji monogatari (2001), Gen no Naishi no Suke
- Winter Days (2003), Yasui (voice)
- The Book of the Dead (2005), narrator
- Haru no Yuki (2005), Kiyoaki's grandmother
- Onaji Tsuki o Miteiru (2005)
- Wool 100% (2006), Ume

=== Television drama ===
- Haru no Sakamichi (1971), Yodo-dono
- Akō Rōshi (1979), Riku
- A un (1980), Kimiko Kadokura
- Shin Jiken: Waga Uta wa Hana Ichimonme (1981), Shizuko Kosaka
- Rirakkusu: Matsubara Katsumi no Nichijō Seikatsu (1982), Mrs. Udagawa
- Mazakon-keiji no Kikenbo (1983)
- Takeda Shingen (1988), Jukei-ni
- Ōinaru Genei (1989), Katsuko Tojyo/Haru Yamafuji
- Yonimo Kimyō na Monogatari (1990)
- Karin (1993)
- Hacchōbori Torimono-banashi (1993)
- Gokenin Zankurō (1995), Zankurō's mother
- Tokugawa Yoshinobu (1998), Matsushima
- Yakusoku (1999), Mom
- Jiko (2001), mother
- Teradake no Hanayome (2001)
- Purinsesu Chuchu (2002), narration
- Akachan o Sagase (2003)
- Dōbutsu no Oisha-san (2003), Taka Nishine
- Boku no Mahōtsukai (2003)
- Yuga na Akuji 2: Kyōto Kadō Iemoto Renzoku Satsujin (2003) TV
- Onna no Naka no Futatsu no Kao (2004), Mrs. Takigawa
- Lone Wolf and Cub (2004), narrator
- Natsumeke no Shokutaku (2005), Kiyo

=== Television animation ===
- Moomin (1969), Moomin
- Moomin (1972), Moomin

== Awards and honours ==
- 1962: Mainichi Film Award for Best Supporting Actress for An Autumn Afternoon, The Outcast and Shinobi no mono
- 1962: Blue Ribbon Award for Best Supporting Actress for An Autumn Afternoon and The Outcast
- 1994: Medal with Purple Ribbon
- 1996: Blue Ribbon Award for Best Supporting Actress for Gakkō no kaidan 2 and Yatsuhaka-mura
- 1999: Kinokuniya Theater Award
