= Winter Song =

Winter Song(s) or The Winter Song may refer to:

== Literature ==
- Winter Song, a 1992 book of poems by Georgina Battiscombe
- Winter Song, a novel by Roberta Gellis
- Winter Song, a 1950 novel by James Hanley
- Žiemos daina (English: Winter song), a poem suite by Henrikas Radauskas

== Music ==
- Winter's song, from Shakespeare's play Love's Labour's Lost

=== Albums ===
- Winter Song (John Tesh album)
- Wintersong, by Sarah McLachlan
- Wintersong (Paul Winter album)
- Winter Song (EP), by Wizz Jones
- Winter Songs (Art Bears album)
- Winter Songs (Ronan Keating album)
- Winter Songs (EP), by Matt Pond PA
- Halford III: Winter Songs, by Halford
- Winter Songs, by Anúna
- Winter Songs, by Ola Gjeilo and Choir of Royal Holloway
- Winter Songs, by Cleo Sol, 2018

=== Songs ===
- "Winter Song" (Chris Rea song), 1991
- "Winter Song" (Sam Fender song), 2020
- "Winter Song" (Sara Bareilles and Ingrid Michaelson song), 2008
- "Winter Song", by Caesars from Paper Tigers
- "Winter Song", by Crash Test Dummies from The Ghosts That Haunt Me
- "Winter Song", by Dreams Come True
- "Winter Song", by Harry Chapin from Sniper and Other Love Songs
- "Winter Song", by Lindisfarne from Nicely Out of Tune
- "Winter Song", by Loudon Wainwright III from Album II
- "Winter Song", by Mark Olson from The Salvation Blues
- "Winter Song", by Nico from Chelsea Girl
- "Winter Song", by Screaming Trees from Sweet Oblivion
- "Winter Song", by Yoko Ono from Approximately Infinite Universe
- "Winter Song", a folk song recorded by Rosalie Sorrels
- "Winter's Song", by Cowboy Junkies from Black Eyed Man
- "The Winter Song", by Au Revoir Simone from Verses of Comfort, Assurance & Salvation
- "The Winter Song", by Angel from White Hot

== See also ==
- Christmas carol
