= Typhoon Over Nagasaki =

1957 film

- Directed by: Yves Ciampi
- Written by: Jean-Charles Tacchella; Zenzô Matsuyama; Annette Wademant; Yves Ciampi
- Produced by: Jacques Bar; Raymond Froment; Kuratarô Takamura
- Starring: Danielle Darrieux; Jean Marais; Keiko Kishi; Gert Fröbe
- Cinematography: Henri Alekan
- Edited by: Roger Dwyre
- Music by: Chuji Kinoshita
- Production companies: Cila Films; Doxa Films; CICC; Pathé; Shochiku
- Distributed by: Pathé Consortium Cinéma
- Release date: 6 February 1957
- Running time: 115 minutes
- Countries: France; Japan; West Germany
- Language: French
- Box office: 2,974,430 admissions (France)

Typhoon Over Nagasaki (French: Typhon sur Nagasaki) is a 1957 French-Japanese-West German romantic drama directed by Yves Ciampi and starring Danielle Darrieux, Jean Marais, Keiko Kishi and Gert Fröbe.

It was shot in Japan in Nagasaki, Hiroshima and Osaka. The film's sets were designed by the art directors Robert Gys and Kisaku Itô.

== Plot ==
Pierre Marsac, a French engineer working at the Nagasaki shipbuilding yards is in love with a young local woman Noriko Sakurai. However, when he encounters a former lover, the journalist Françoise Fabre he drifts apart from Noriko. Tragedy strikes when a typhoon overwhelms the region.

== Cast ==
- Danielle Darrieux as Françoise Fabre
- Jean Marais as Pierre Marsac
- Keiko Kishi as Noriko Sakurai
- Sō Yamamura as Hori
- Hitomi Nozoe as Saeko Sakurai
- Kumeko Urabe as Fujita
- Gert Fröbe as Ritter
- Shinobu Asaji as Keiko Ritter

== Bibliography ==
- Parish, James Robert. Film Actors Guide: Western Europe. Scarecrow Press, 1977.
