= The Box Man (manga) =

Japanese manga series

- The cover of The Box Man, showing a strange man that appears in the story

箱の男 (Hako no Otoko)
- Manga
- Written by: Imiri Sakabashira
- Published by: Seirinkogeisha
- English publisher: Drawn & Quarterly
- Magazine: Ax
- Published: October 31, 2004
- Volumes: 1

The Box Man (Japanese: 箱の男, Hepburn: Hako no Otoko) is a Japanese gekiga manga written and illustrated by Imiri Sakabashira. It is about a man traveling on a scooter with a cat-kappa and a box containing a man with crab claws. The manga was serialized in Seirinkogeisha's alternate manga magazine Ax and collected on October 31, 2004. Drawn & Quarterly published the manga on January 19, 2010.

== Plot ==
A man rides a scooter along with a cat-kappa creature and a box which holds a man with crab claws. A lizard jumps out of the water and shoots a beam at them out of its mouth, causing the scooter to crash, so the man buys a new one at a junkyard. As they are riding on a ledge, the front wheel falls off, and they fall into a canopy of cables. They continue on foot and two police officers stop them to inspect the box. The man in the box beheads one of the officers, while castrating the other, and they run and hide in a house. Inside, a floating head leads them to a menacing masked figure, who is appeased when he licks a psychoactive toad given by the man in the box and enters a trance. The group continues on to another house, where, along with a strange man, they observe various monsters harming humans. On a projector, one of the humans, a woman in latex and fishnet clothing, wrestles the strange man, killing him, but he doesn't die. As the groups leaves, some of the monsters follow and attack them, and they escape on a scooter stolen from a singer. As they are being chased, they run into police officers who recognize them, and the officers fight and kill the monsters. The officers chase them in a police car until they crash when outmaneuvered. The man takes the person in the box—his father who had gained a crab-like lower body—and leaves him, along with the creature, at the Sea of Decadence for his behavior.

== Release ==
The story, originally serialized in Seirinkogeisha's alternate manga magazine Ax, was included in the short story collection Red Tights Man (赤タイツ男, Aka Taitsu Otoko) published on October 31, 2004. Drawn & Quarterly published the manga on September 29, 2009.

== Themes ==
Oliver Ho of PopMatters offers that the manga could be a metaphor for aging and death, with the son transporting his aging father who he can't take care of anymore, and with the grotesqueness and violence representing "the son's horror at age and decay."

== Reception ==
Katherine Dacey of Manga Bookshelf disliked the manga's lack of plot and its grotesque sexual action, though she noted that "Sakabashira has a fertile imagination" and that he "has serious drawing chops; his streetscapes have a vital energy and specificity that's missing from a lot of manga", concluding: "it's vivid and hallucinatory and nightmarish, yet in the end, all that furious activity doesn't signify very much". Ho called the manga "a beautiful, mind-bending little book that balances straightforward action with phantasmagorical, at times nightmarish, images." Connie C. of Pop Culture Shock noted that the lack of narrative might not appeal to readers, but praised its surreal qualities as well as the art style.
