= Zatoichi (disambiguation) =

Zatoichi is a fictional character created by Japanese novelist Kan Shimozawa.

Zatoichi may also refer to:

- Zatoichi (1989 film), a Japanese chambara film
- Zatoichi (2003 film), a Japanese jidaigeki action film
- Zatoichi (2008 film), a filmed stage production of the play Zatoichi
- "Zatoichi", a song by Denzel Curry from the album Melt My Eyez See Your Future
