= Dark Entries (record label) =

American record label specializing in underground music

Dark Entries is a San Francisco-based record label that releases and reissues underground music from different eras and locations. Founded in 2009 by Joshua Cheon, Dark Entries has released nearly 200 albums and singles, sometimes averaging three to four new releases a month. The name comes from a Bauhaus song.

Dark Entries has rereleased many forgotten albums, including gay pornography soundtracks by Patrick Cowley, as well as releases by Thomas Leer, Lena Platonos, and Crash Course in Science. Their reissues of works by Severed Heads, and a solo album by frontman Tom Ellard, led to the group’s first live dates in the US in over 20 years.

Dark Entries opened a physical record shop, at 910 Larkin Street in San Francisco, in 2022.
