= Woman in the Dunes =

1964 drama film by Hiroshi Teshigahara

- Theatrical release poster
- Directed by: Hiroshi Teshigahara
- Screenplay by: Kōbō Abe
- Based on: The Woman in the Dunes by Kōbō Abe
- Produced by: Kiichi Ichikawa; Tadashi Ono
- Starring: Eiji Okada; Kyōko Kishida; Kōji Mitsui
- Cinematography: Hiroshi Segawa
- Edited by: Fusako Shuzui
- Music by: Toru Takemitsu
- Production company: Teshigahara Production
- Distributed by: Toho
- Release date: February 15, 1964 (Japan)
- Running time: 146 minutes
- Country: Japan
- Language: Japanese

Woman in the Dunes or Woman of the Dunes (Japanese: 砂の女, Hepburn: Suna no Onna; lit. 'Sand Woman') is a 1964 Japanese drama film directed by Hiroshi Teshigahara and written by Kobo Abe. It stars Eiji Okada, Kyōko Kishida, and Kōji Mitsui. Associated with the Japanese New Wave, it received widespread critical acclaim and was nominated for two Academy Awards. The screenplay for the film was adapted by Abe from his 1962 novel of the same name.

Woman in the Dunes was an independent, joint production of Teshigahara Productions and the Japanese Art Theater Guild, a group of young filmmakers involved in an attempt to create political–aesthetical films in opposition to the dominant studio productions of the 1960s, which they viewed as commercial, unartistic, and uninteresting.

The film is considered to be Teshigahara's masterpiece and one of the best movies of Japanese cinema and the 20th century. After modern evaluation, it is now widely regarded as one of the greatest films of all time. The film is also seen as one of the most ambiguous, cryptic and enigmatic movies ever made. It is one of Russian filmmaker Andrei Tarkovsky's top ten favorite movies of all time. Glenn Gould explicitly tracked the cinematic framing, stating he would "see this film forty or fifty times and study literally every shot in the film," specifically pointing to Woman in the Dunes as "quite possibly the greatest film ever made."

== Plot ==
Schoolteacher and amateur entomologist Niki Junpei leaves Tokyo for a rural coastal village to collect tiger beetles and other insects. He is self-absorbed, dissatisfied with his life in Tokyo, and rude to his hosts.

After a long day of searching, Junpei misses the last bus ride back to the city. The locals invite him to spend the night at their village. Junpei agrees and is guided down a rope ladder to a hut at the bottom of a sand dune, which resembles a large pit. Due to the steep slopes of the dune, the ladder appears to be the only way in or out. Junpei learns that his host, a young woman, lost her husband and daughter in a sandstorm a year ago and now lives alone; their bodies are said to be buried under the sand somewhere near the hut. The widow explains that the sand is constantly falling on the house, and without shoveling it out every day, she will be buried.

After dinner, the widow goes outside to shovel the sand into buckets, which the villagers reel in from the top of the dune. Junpei offers to help, but she refuses, telling him that he is a guest and there is no need for him to help on the first day. A passer-by ominously refers to Junpei as the widow's "helper".

The next morning, Junpei gets ready to leave but finds that the rope ladder has been pulled up. He tries and fails to climb up the dune. He realises that the villagers trapped him in the pit so that he can live with the widow and help her dig sand, which the village sells to a cement company on the black market. The widow is as much a slave of the villagers as Junpei is. The villagers control both of them by limiting their access to water and provisions.

The widow has long resigned herself to her fate, and entreats Junpei to help her shovel the sand. Although Junpei points out that the sand is poor quality and will make defective cement, she crassly explains that it is not her problem. With the sand piling up in and around the house, Junpei finally agrees to help the widow dig; however, he continues plotting his escape. Although the widow has trapped Junpei, she also grows emotionally attached to him. The two become lovers.

Junpei uses an improvised grappling hook to haul himself out of the pit. However, the villagers chase him into quicksand, which forces him to ask his captors for help. The villagers free him and return him to the widow.

Like the widow, Junpei eventually resigns himself to his situation. Frustrated with the monotony of the pit, he asks his captors to see the nearby sea every day. The villagers agree on the condition that he has sex with the widow while they watch. Junpei agrees, but the widow refuses, calling him a pervert. Junpei tries to force himself on the widow anyway, but she fends him off while the villagers watch.

Through his persistent efforts to trap a crow as a messenger, Junpei discovers a way to draw water from the damp sand at night by capillary action. His efforts to perfect the technique help him settle into an easy routine. When an ectopic pregnancy threatens to kill the widow, the villagers take her to a doctor. They leave the rope ladder hanging, and Junpei climbs out. After going to see the nearby sea, he chooses to go back in the pit, telling himself that he can still escape later. He muses that he would like to show someone his method of water production, and the villagers would be the best audience.

The film's final shot is of a police report stating that Junpei has been missing for seven years.

== Cast ==
- Eiji Okada as Niki Junpei, an amateur entomologist and schoolteacher from Tokyo. Okada was cast in various Japanese films in the 1950s, but it was not until he appeared in Hiroshima mon amour in 1959 that he gained a worldwide reputation.
- Kyōko Kishida as the widow in the dunes. Kishida was a Japanese actress, voice performer, and writer of children's books. In addition to Woman in the Dunes, in the West she is best known for The Face of Another (1966, also directed by Teshigahara) and Yasujirō Ozu's An Autumn Afternoon (1962). She was a founding member of the theater group Engeki Shudan En, which was formed in 1975.
- Kōji Mitsui as the village elder who lures the entomologist to the widow's home. He was billed above the film's title on the original Woman in the Dunes film poster, alongside Okada and Kishida, with the studio-era convention of appending his name with small characters indicating that Toho had borrowed the contracted player from Shochiku.

== Production ==
=== Development ===
Prior to the production of Woman in the Dunes, Hiroshi Teshigahara directed Pitfall (おとし穴, Otoshiana), a.k.a. The Pitfall and Kashi To Kodomo, which was written by Kōbō Abe. Pitfall was Teshigahara's first feature, and the first of his four film collaborations with Abe and composer Tōru Takemitsu.

=== Technical details ===
With a run time of 123 minutes / 147 minutes (director's cut), the film was shot in 35 mm negative format by Hiroshi Segawa, the director of photography.

=== Location ===
Woman in the Dunes was shot on location at the Hamaoka sand dunes in Omaezaki, Shizuoka Prefecture, although many sources in English erroneously report that the film was shot in the Tottori Sand Dunes in Tottori Prefecture.

=== Release ===
The roadshow version of Woman in the Dunes was released in Japan on February 15, 1964 where it was distributed by Toho. The general release for Woman in the Dunes in Japan was April 18, 1964; the film was cut to 127 minutes.

The film was released in the United States by Pathe Contemporary Films with English subtitles on September 17, 1964. The film ran at 127 minutes. The film was also featured in the New York Film Festival on September 16, 1964.

The film was also featured in several other film festivals across the world such as the Cannes Film Festival in France, Adelaide Film Festival in Australia, and Clasicos del Cine Japones in Argentina on November 21, 2000.

The Criterion Collection released a DVD box set collecting Woman in the Dunes in its original length along with Teshigahara's Pitfall and The Face of Another in 2007. This release is now out of print. In August 2016, Criterion released the film as a stand-alone Blu-ray with a brand new high definition transfer.

== Critical reception ==
The film has a rating of 100% on review aggregator site Rotten Tomatoes based on 29 reviews, with an average rating of 9.0/10. It is one of Russian filmmaker Andrei Tarkovsky's top ten favorite movies of all time..

Roger Ebert inducted Woman in the Dunes into his Great Movies list in 1998. Viewing the work as a retelling of the Sisyphus myth, he wrote: "There has never been sand photography like this (no, not even in Lawrence of Arabia), and by anchoring the story so firmly in this tangible physical reality, the cinematographer, Hiroshi Segawa, helps the director pull off the difficult feat of telling a parable as if it is really happening." Strictly Film School describes it as "a spare and haunting allegory for human existence". According to Max Tessier, the main theme of the film is the desire to escape from society.

The film's composer, Tōru Takemitsu, was praised. Nathaniel Thompson wrote, "[Takemitsu's] often jarring, experimental music here is almost a character unto itself, insinuating itself into the fabric of the celluloid as imperceptibly as the sand." Ebert also stated that the score "doesn't underline the action but mocks it, with high, plaintive notes, harsh, like a metallic wind".

In the world's most rigorous cinematic evaluation—the British Film Institute's Sight & Sound Top 100 Greatest Films of All Time—the film explicitly placed at #72 in 2012 and #84 in 2022. The film is a mandatory inclusion in Steven Jay Schneider's globally published book, 1001 Movies You Must See Before You Die.

The game director Hideo Kojima, a fan of Kōbō Abe, has praised the movie.

=== Awards ===
The film won a Special Jury Prize at the 1964 Cannes Film Festival and was nominated for the Academy Award for Best Foreign Language Film in the same year (losing to Yesterday, Today and Tomorrow). In 1965, Teshigahara was nominated for the Best Director Oscar (losing to Robert Wise for The Sound of Music). In 1967, the film won the Grand Prix of the Belgian Film Critics Association.

== See also ==
- List of Japanese submissions for the Academy Award for Best Foreign Language Film
- List of submissions to the 37th Academy Awards for Best Foreign Language Film
- The House of Sand
