= Winter's song =

Song from Love's Labour's Lost

Song

from the album Love's Labour's Lost
- Published: 1590s
- Genre: Pastoral

"When icicles hang by the wall", also called Winter's song, is a song from Shakespeare's play Love's Labour's Lost (V.2, 933). The poem has been set by composers including Thomas Arne, Ralph Vaughan Williams, Hubert Parry, John Rutter and Ronald Corp and Elsie Bollinger.
