= The Man Who Turned Into A Stick =

1957 one-act play by Kōbō Abe

- Cover of English translation (alongside The Suitcase and The Cliff of Time), 1978
- Original title: 棒になった男 – Bō ni natta otoko
- Original language: Japanese
- Written by: Kōbō Abe
- Genre: Magic realism

Premiere
- Date: 1967
- Place: Kinokuniya Hall, Shinjuku, Tokyo, Japan

The Man Who Turned Into A Stick (棒になった男 – Bō ni natta otoko) is a one-act play written in 1957 by Kōbō Abe. It is the first of three plays written between 1957 and 1969 meant to symbolize the different stages of life, usually shown together. The first, representing birth, is The Suitcase. The second, The Cliff of Time, represents life itself, or The Process and the third, The Man who Turned into a Stick, is death. The play was first presented at Kinokuniya Hall in 1967.

Scholar Donald Keene translated all three plays in 1975, which are published in The Man Who Turned into a Stick: Three Related Plays. This play has been considered as a main example of the current of magic realism in Japanese literature. Hideo Kojima has referred to the play as thematic inspiration for the 2019 video game Death Stranding, alongside Abe's 1950 short story The Stick.

== Setting ==
The play is set in June on a hot Sunday afternoon with a department store in the background and crowds of people passing by. Two hippies, a man and a woman sit on the sidewalk when a stick comes falling from the sky. This stick, only seconds prior was a man who fell off a roof with his child watching. This stick falls down and nearly hits Hippie Boy.

== Plot ==
=== Beginning ===
It is a hot Sunday, when a stick falls from the sky and nearly strikes Hippie Boy in the Head. Hippie Boy and Hippie girl suspect that the son of the Man Who Turned into a Stick is the culprit of the flying stick. Hippie Girl questions whether the stick falling is an accident if it hits or misses. The Man who Turned into a Stick tries to explain that this child is not the culprit, but instead was a witness to his fall.

=== Middle ===
The Man from Hell and the Woman from Hell come onto the stage and recite poetic verses about the fallen stick. The Man from Hell asks Hippie Boy where he found the stick, and if he can hand the stick over. The Man From Hells asks what aims Hippie Boy has with the stick, and Hippie Boy explains that he does not have any aims. Hippie Girl laments that people ought to have at least a few aims. Hippie Boy initially refuses to hand over the stick because he suspects that the Man from Hell threw the stick at him. However, Hippie Boy later decides to sell the stick for five dollars precisely because he does not want to sell the stick. The Man from Hell tells Hippie Boy that five dollars was a bad deal; it was not the stick that he sold, but himself in the process.

=== End ===
After retrieving the stick, the Woman from Hells begins her report under the supervision of the Man from Hell. The Woman from Hell notes that the stick looks as if it has been used throughout its life by individuals for a certain purpose. Though she is not meant to, she feels compassion for the Man Who Turned into a Stick and calls him a "poor thing". The Man from Hell disagrees with this sentiment: the stick has endured abuse yet it remains a stick, and therefore ought to be called a "capable and faithful stick". After registering the details of the stick to the Voice from Hell, the Woman from Hell asks if she can return the stick to the son, but the Man from Hell refuses. The Man from Hell argues that the stick was satisfied with his life, but the Man who Turned into a Stick disagrees; he was never once satisfied in his life and that is why he has transformed into a stick. The play ends with the Man from Hell referring to the entire audience as a "forest of sticks", and the Woman from Hell agrees: the Man Who Turned into a Stick has many friends whom have also turned into sticks.

== Characters ==
=== Man from Hell ===
The Man from Hell is the supervisor of the Woman from Hell, who is on her first day of the job. Both the Man from Hell and the Woman from Hell work to record the lives of people who have turned into objects upon death. Unlike the Woman from Hell, the Man from Hell does not display the same sympathy for the Man Who Turned into a Stick. When the Woman from Hell suggests that they return the Man Who Turned into a Stick to the son of the deceased, The Man from Hell is entirely detached from this sentiment; he believes that a stick remains a stick regardless of whomever holds it. The Man from Hell holds no feeling towards the deceased, as he remarks that after all, (he points to the crowd watching the play) there are a whole forest of sticks.

=== Woman from Hell ===
The Woman from Hell is newly appointed to the Earth Duty Squad, and the Man from Hell is acting as her supervisor. Like the Man from Hell, her job is to record the individuals who turn into objects upon death. However, since she is new at her job, she has not yet become detached from the individuals she is recording. She feels real emotion towards the Man Who Turned into Stick and worries that he cannot scratch his own back or that he should be returned to his living son, but comforts The Man Who Turned into a Stick by explaining that he has many friends who have turned into sticks.

=== The Man Who Turned into a Stick ===
The Man Who Turned into a Stick jumps off the roof and turns into a four-foot long stick. The Man Who Turned into a Stick is taken by Hippie Boy and Hippie Girl and remains silent until he hears his child crying. However, it seems as though no one can hear the Man Who Turned into Stick's remarks. Despite this, the Man Who Turned into a Stick continues to explain how he came to be in this situation: he was watching the crowds of people below with his son pestering him for a dime, but he swiftly turned into a stick and flew into the air. The Man Who Turned into a Stick questions whether there was anything he could have done to prevent his situation. He explains that he has never felt satisfied in his life.

=== Hippie Boy ===
The Hippie Boy was sitting on the sidewalk next to Hippie Girl, when a stick falls and nearly hits him in the head. He remarks that the stick looks a lot like himself, and that this worries him. When he finds the stick, at first he is not willing to give it to The Man from Hell, but he ends up selling the stick to The Man from Hell for five dollars. He explains that he is selling the stick for the sole reason that he does not want to sell it.

=== Hippie Girl ===
Hippie Girl is partnered with Hippie Boy. Hippie Girl worries about not having any aims in life. Hippie Girl laments that she and Hippie Boy are alienated, and she blames the generation gap for certain differences between herself and Hippie Boy compared to the Man and Woman from Hell.

=== Voice from Hell ===
The Voice from Hell is a mysterious voice that works at the same headquarters as the Man and Woman from Hell. He is the person that the Man and Woman from Hell report to.

== Critical reception ==
The Man Who Turned into a Stick is a difficult play to understand, and many scholars have attempted to decipher its meaning. For example, some have argued that the Man Who Turned into a Stick represents the Japanese workforce in the 1930-1940's, as The Man From Hell describes the Man who Turned into a Stick as having put up with different forms abuse without having run away. Thus, it has been argued by some that the Man Who Turned into a Stick transformed into a physical representation of his life as a worker: a tool used by others for the purpose of some task. The Man from Hell commented on the rising number of sticks, which some scholars have argued that this implies that worker's lives are dehumanized and their working conditions are so deary that their entire life is akin to that of a stick. Similarly, some argue that Hippie Boy and Hippie Girl symbolize the counterculture / new generation of the 1960s. Finally, some scholars have also pointed out, that despite being part of the "new generation", Hippie Boy sees much of himself in the stick, which may suggest that the new generation has it no better than the previous ones, and that Hippie Boy and Hippie Girl will also turn into sticks or rubber hoses, (as explained by the Man From Hell).
