= The Man Without a Map =

- Film poster
- Directed by: Hiroshi Teshigahara
- Written by: Kōbō Abe
- Based on: The Ruined Map by Kōbō Abe
- Produced by: Masaichi Nagata
- Starring: Shintaro Katsu; Etsuko Ichihara; Osamu Okawa; Kiyoshi Atsumi; Tamao Nakamura
- Cinematography: Akira Uehara
- Edited by: Tatsuji Nakashizu
- Music by: Toru Takemitsu
- Distributed by: Toho
- Release date: June 1, 1968 (Japan)
- Running time: 118 minutes
- Country: Japan
- Language: Japanese

The Man Without a Map (Japanese: 燃えつきた地図, Hepburn: Moetsukita chizu) is a 1968 Japanese film directed by Hiroshi Teshigahara and starring Shintaro Katsu. The screenplay was adapted by Kōbō Abe from his novel The Ruined Map. This was the fifth and final film collaboration between Teshigahara and Abe.

== Cast ==
- Shintaro Katsu – Detective
- Etsuko Ichihara – Wife
- Osamu Okawa – Wife's brother
- Kiyoshi Atsumi – Tashiro
- Tamao Nakamura – Detective's wife
- Kinzō Shin – Coffee shop owner
