= The Face of Another (film) =

1966 Japanese New Wave film by Hiroshi Teshigahara

- Theatrical release poster
- Kanji: 他人の顔
- Revised Hepburn: Tanin no Kao
- Directed by: Hiroshi Teshigahara
- Screenplay by: Kōbō Abe
- Based on: The Face of Another by Kōbō Abe
- Produced by: Hiroshi Teshigahara
- Starring: Tatsuya Nakadai; Machiko Kyō; Kyōko Kishida
- Cinematography: Hiroshi Segawa
- Edited by: Yoshi Sugihara
- Music by: Toru Takemitsu
- Production companies: Teshigahara Productions; Tokyo Eiga
- Distributed by: Toho
- Release date: 15 July 1966 (Japan)
- Running time: 121 minutes
- Country: Japan
- Language: Japanese

The Face of Another (Japanese: 他人の顔, Hepburn: Tanin no Kao) is a 1966 Japanese New Wave film directed by Hiroshi Teshigahara and based on the 1964 novel of the same name written by Kōbō Abe. The story follows engineer Okuyama, who suffers severe facial burns in a work-related accident and is given a new face in the form of a lifelike mask.

== Plot ==
Engineer Okuyama's face was disfigured by an explosion in an industrial accident, and he now wears bandages to cover the burns. Feeling isolated and physically rejected by his wife, he consults a psychiatrist. Seeing the frustration Okuyama experiences from his facial disfiguration, the psychiatrist proposes the creation of an experimental prosthetic mask for him, apparently with great reluctance.

The psychiatrist and Okuyama offer a man 10,000 yen to serve as the model for the mask, and the mask is built and fitted onto Okuyama's face. The psychiatrist demands that Okuyama regularly report his sensations and thoughts to him, and cautions Okuyama that the mask may change his behavior and personality so much that he will cease to be the same person. Okuyama tells no one that he has received the mask, and simply lives as a new man, telling his wife that he is traveling on business while he rents an apartment nearby. He tests the mask's effectiveness on a secretary at his company, who doesn't recognize him, and the apartment superintendent's mentally challenged daughter, who does. During a meeting between Okuyama and the psychiatrist, the latter realizes that his patient has already changed, and imagines a world where the mask goes into mass production, subsequently eliminating all sense of morality.

Okuyama decides to seduce his wife using his new identity. When she goes along with it too easily, he becomes enraged and reveals himself to her. She in turn says she had known his true identity from the first moment he approached her. He tries to persuade her to give their relationship another chance, but she rejects him, saying she cannot forgive his attempt to deceive her by pretending the mask was his real face. Later, Okuyama attempts to rape a woman on the street, claiming to be nobody when arrested. He is freed thanks to his psychiatrist (whose business card the police found in Okuyama's pocket), who testifies that Okuyama is his patient and that he is not violent. While walking the streets together that night, they see that everyone else on the street is wearing a mask. The psychiatrist asks Okuyama for the mask back, but then changes his mind and decides to let him keep it, as he is a free man. While shaking hands in farewell, Okuyama stabs him to death.

Interwoven throughout the film is a separate tale (present in Abe's original novel in the form of a movie the protagonist watches at a cinema and then recounts) of a young woman whose otherwise beautiful face is severely disfigured on the right cheek and neck. She works in a psychiatric ward, whose inmates include many World War II veterans, and lives with her brother. The imagery of these sequences, her repeated worry about the coming of another war, and her asking her brother if he still remembers the sea at Nagasaki (presumably from their childhood there), all suggest that her scars are a result of the atomic bombing of that city. Like Okuyama, she feels isolated because of her disfigurement. On a trip to a seaside inn with her brother, she makes a romantic overture towards him, to which he is receptive. The next morning, she dresses all in white, removes her shoes, and walks into the ocean, likely intending to commit suicide. Seeing her from the inn window, her brother cries out in despair.

== Cast ==
- Tatsuya Nakadai as Mr. Okuyama
- Machiko Kyō as Mrs. Okuyama
- Mikijirō Hira as Psychiatrist
- Kyōko Kishida as Nurse Kyoko
- Eiji Okada as The Boss
- Minoru Chiaki as Apartment Superintendent
- Hideo Kanze as Male Patient
- Kunie Tanaka as Patient at Mental Hospital
- Etsuko Ichihara as Yo-Yo Girl
- Bibari Maeda as Singer in Bar
- Miki Irie as Girl with Scar
- Eiko Muramatsu as Secretary
- Yoshie Minami as Old Lady
- Hisashi Igawa as Man with Mole
- Kakuya Saeki as Elder Brother of Girl with Scar

== Production ==
One recurring image is the large and small severed ears which appear in the scenery in several scenes. These ears were designed and sculpted by Japanese sculptor Tomio Miki.

Hira's office, a strange blank space with glass partitions, was designed by architect Arata Isozaki, a friend of Teshigahara's. The glass walls are painted with Langer's lines and Leonardo da Vinci's Vitruvian Man.

The film uses several doublings of shots, both by repeating shots verbatim and by placing the main character in nearly identical shots twice. The most obvious example is in Okuyama's two separate rentals of apartments, once masked, and once with his new face. These doublings highlight Okuyama's double existence.

== Release ==
The Face of Another had a roadshow on July 15, 1966, in Japan, where it was distributed by Toho. The film received general release in Japan on September 23, 1967.

In the United States, the film received a theatrical release on June 9, 1967. It was re-issued in the US in May 1975 by Rising Sun and Toho.

== Reception ==
The Face of Another was not well received outside of Japan, with audiences and critics largely feeling that it did not live up to Teshigahara's earlier film The Woman in the Dunes. Although it was successful in Japan, the film was a critical and financial failure internationally.

Vincent Canby of The New York Times wrote in 1974, "As fiction it's too fanciful to be seriously compelling and too glib to be especially thought-provoking." In 2008, film scholar Alexander Jacoby called it "a flawed fantasy" whose interesting theme suffers from the protagonist's "bland characterization."

The film has since improved its critical standing. On review aggregator Rotten Tomatoes, the film holds a 100% approval rating based on 7 reviews, with an average rating of 7.5/10. Jonathan Rosenbaum of the Chicago Reader defended the film in his 2005 review, calling it "more palatable" than Teshigahara's previous works, the theme "brilliantly and imaginatively explored," and the acting "potent." The game director Hideo Kojima, a fan of the writer Kōbō Abe, is a fan of The Face of Another.

== Awards ==
The Face of Another received two Mainichi Film Awards for Best Art Direction and Best Film Score.
