= Eisuke Yoshiyuki =

Japanese writer and poet (1906–1940)

- Yoshiyuki in 1930
- Born: May 10, 1906; Okayama Prefecture, Japan
- Died: July 8, 1940 (aged 34)
- Occupations: Writer, stockbroker
- Children: Junnosuke Yoshiyuki; Kazuko Yoshiyuki; Rie Yoshiyuki

Eisuke Yoshiyuki (吉行 エイスケ, Yoshiyuki Eisuke; May 10, 1906 – July 8, 1940) was a Japanese author.

He was born in Okayama Prefecture. He moved to Tokyo after leaving school as a teen, and worked on several magazines associated with the Japanese Dada Movement.

His son, Junnosuke Yoshiyuki, was also a noted author; his daughter, Kazuko Yoshiyuki, a well-known actress; and his other daughter, Rie Yoshiyuki, was a poet and novelist. The 1997 NHK Asadora Aguri was based on Eisuke's life with his wife Aguri.
