= The Box Man (novel) =

Japanese novel

The Box Man (箱男, Hako Otoko) is a novel by Kobo Abe, originally published in Japanese in 1973, about a man wearing a cardboard box and his observations of the world outside. It has been made into an eponymous film by Gakuryu Ishii, starring Masatoshi Nagase, which premiered at 74th Berlin International Film Festival on 17 February 2024.
