= Junnosuke Yoshiyuki =

Japanese writer (1924–1994)

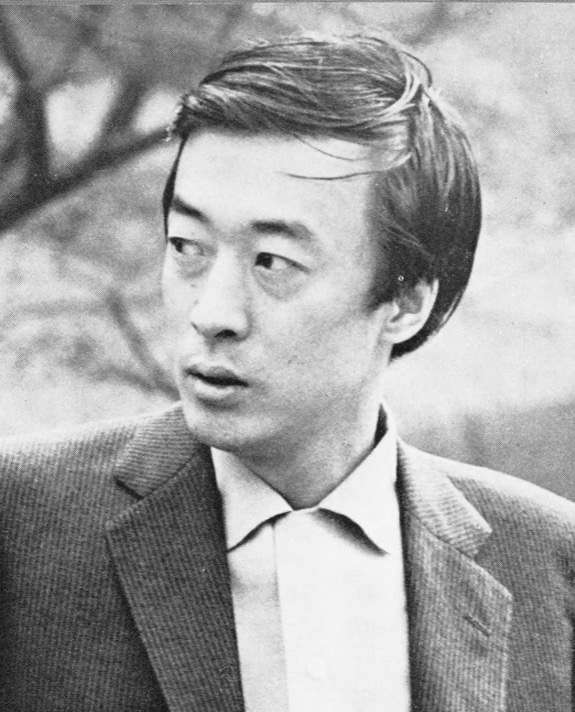
Junnosuke Yoshiyuki

Junnosuke Yoshiyuki (吉行 淳之介, Yoshiyuki Junnosuke; April 13, 1924 – July 26, 1994) was a Japanese novelist and short-story writer, and a member of the so-called "Third Generation of Postwar Writers" (第3の新人).

== Life ==
Yoshiyuki was born in Okayama, the oldest child of author Eisuke Yoshiyuki, but his family moved to Tokyo when he was 3. He attended Shizuoka High School, where he grew interested in Thomas Mann's stories, and in 1945 entered the University of Tokyo. He left the university without a degree and began working full-time as an editor at a weekly scandal magazine, while spending much of his leisure time gambling, drinking, and frequenting prostitutes. Sexuality and prostitution would form a consistent theme in his writing.

== Works and awards ==
Yoshiyuki's first published fiction was Bara Hanbainin (薔薇販売人, The Rose Seller, 1950), followed by the novels Genshoku no Machi (The City of Primary Colors, 1951, revised 1956), Shūu (驟雨, Sudden Shower, 1954), for which he won the Akutagawa Prize, and Shofu no Heya (Room of a Whore, 1958). His novel Anshitsu (暗室, The Dark Room, 1969) won the Tanizaki Prize. He won the Yomiuri Prize for his 1974 novel Kaban no nakami (鞄の中身). Another of his most celebrated works, Yugure Made (夕暮れまで, 1978, published in English translation as Toward Dusk and Other Stories by Kurodahan Press, 2011), took 13 years to write but once published quickly became a best-seller and won the Noma Literary Prize. See also Fair Dalliance: Fifteen Stories by Yoshiyuki Junnosuke, Kurodahan Press, 2011.
