= Hiroshi Teshigahara =

Japanese film director (1927–2001)

- Born: January 28, 1927; Chiyoda, Tokyo, Japan
- Died: April 14, 2001 (aged 74); Tokyo, Japan
- Education: Tokyo National University of Fine Arts and Music, Tokyo, Japan
- Occupation: Film director
- Notable work: Pitfall (1962); Woman in the Dunes (1964); The Face of Another (1966)
- Spouse: Toshiko Kobayashi
- Relatives: Sofu Teshigahara (father)
- Awards: Jury Prize (Cannes Film Festival) (1964), Berlin International Film Festival C.I.A.C.E. Award (1990)

Hiroshi Teshigahara (勅使河原 宏, Teshigahara Hiroshi; January 28, 1927 – April 14, 2001) was a Japanese avant-garde filmmaker and artist from the Japanese New Wave era. He is best known for the 1964 film Woman in the Dunes. He is also known for directing other titles such as The Face of Another (1966), Natsu no Heitai (Summer Soldiers, 1972), and Pitfall (1962), which was Teshigahara's directorial debut. He has been called "one of the most acclaimed Japanese directors of all time". Teshigahara is the first person of Asian descent to be nominated for the Academy Award for Best Director, accomplishing this in 1964 for his work on Woman in the Dunes. Apart from being a filmmaker, Teshigahara also practiced other arts, such as calligraphy, pottery, painting, opera and ikebana.

== Biography ==
Teshigahara was born in Tokyo, the son of Sōfu Teshigahara, founder and grand master of the Sōgetsu-ryū school of ikebana. He graduated in 1950 from the Tokyo National University of Fine Arts and Music and began working in documentary film. He met Taro Okamoto and Kobo Abe, eventually becoming one of the youngest members of Abe's multidisciplinary collective, Seiki No Kai. He directed his first feature film, Pitfall (1962), in collaboration with author Kōbō Abe and musician Toru Takemitsu. The film won the NHK New Director's award, and throughout the 1960s, he continued to collaborate on films with Abe and Takemitsu while simultaneously pursuing his interest in ikebana and sculpture on a professional level.

From 1958 to 1971, he served as the director of the Sogetsu Art Center, a pioneering venue for avant-garde art. Many of his friends (Yuji Takahashi, Toru Takemitsu, Fusako Shuzui, Genpei Akasegawa, Kiyoshi Awazu, and Toshi Ichiyanagi) and collaborators from SAC later joined forces to work on his feature films.

In 1965, the Teshigahara/Abe film Woman in the Dunes (1964) was nominated for an Academy Award for Best Foreign Language Film and won the Special Jury Prize at the Cannes Film Festival. Although the original director's cut of Woman in the Dunes was 147 minutes, he cut it down to 124 minutes when he was invited to the Cannes Film Festival. In 1972, he worked with Japanese researcher and translator John Nathan to make Summer Soldiers, a film set during the Vietnam War about American deserters living on the fringe of Japanese society.

In 1973, he established the Sogetsu Ceramic Kiln in Fukui prefecture. It remains open to this day to all ceramic artists. From the mid-1970s onwards, he worked less frequently on feature films as he concentrated more on documentaries, exhibitions and the Sogetsu School and became grand master of the school in 1980.

In 1980, after the death of his father, Teshigahara became the third generation Iemoto of Sogetsu School, using bamboo at his large-scale solo exhibitions at several well known museums, including the National Museum of Contemporary Art in Seoul, Korea (1989), Palazzo Reale in Milan, Italy (1995), and the Kennedy Center in Washington, D.C. (1996), among other venues. In Japan, Teshigahara displayed his art installations nationwide, including Gen-Ichiro Inokuma Museum of Contemporary Art in Marugame and Hiroshima City Museum of Contemporary Art. In the 1990s, he pushed the art form of renka, which is a series of impromptu Ikebana arranged by multiple artists. Teshigahara was also involved in ceramics calligraphy and installation art.

Throughout his career, Teshigahara also involved himself in stage and art direction, both domestically and internationally. He has directed performances such as the opera Turandot (Lyon, France, 1992; Geneva, Switzerland, 1996), and an original Noh play Susanô with Noh actor Hideo Kanze and composer Maki Ishii (the Avignon Theatre Festival, 1994), Sloka by Chandralekha Dance Company (1999), and original outdoor dance play Susano Iden (1991).

== Installations ==
In 1983, Teshigahara created a permanent installation at the Ken Domon Museum, Sakata, Japan.

Teshigahara designed the Ayatori Bridge, a pink modern bridge that connects to the Yamanaka Onsen in Kaga, Ishikawa Prefecture.

== Death and legacy ==
Teshigahara died at the age of 74 on April 14, 2001, in his hometown, Tokyo, Japan.

On the first anniversary of his death, April 14, 2002, a DVD box set containing his best known work was released in Japan in commemoration.

On June 7, 2025, his eldest daughter, Kiri Teshigahara, launched a two-year centennial commemoration, which will conclude on his centennial birth year in 2027.

== Filmography ==
Teshigahara's filmography includes:

Year	Title	Position	Note
1953	Hokusai	Director	Short documentary
1955	12 Photographers	Director	Short documentary
1957	Ikebana	Director and writer of screenplay	Short documentary
1958	Yuurakucho District 0	Writer of screenplay	Lost
1958	Tokyo 1958		
1958	The Sea is Alive	Director of art	
1959	José Torres	Director of shooting	Short documentary
1962	Pitfall	Director	
1962	Sculptures of Sofu-Vita	Director	Short documentary
1964	Woman in the Dunes	Director	
1965	White Morning	Director	Short film
1965	José Torres Part II	Director	Short documentary
1966	The Face of Another	Director	
1966	Bakusō		
1967	インディレース 爆走	Producer	
1968	The Man Without a Map	Director	
1970	240 Hours in One Day	Director	Short film made for the Osaka Expo
1972	Summer Soldiers	Director, cinematographer, planner, and producer	
1977	Our Leading Role	Director	TV film
1978	Shin Zatōichi	Director	Two film-length TV episodes
1981	Sculpture Mouvante – Jean Tinguely	Director	Short documentary
1984	Antoni Gaudi	Director, producer, co-planner, and editor	Documentary
1989	Rikyu	Director, producer, and co-writer of screenplay	
1992	Princess Goh	Director, producer, and co-writer of screenplay	
