= Kōbō Abe =

Japanese writer, playwright, photographer and inventor

- 安部 公房
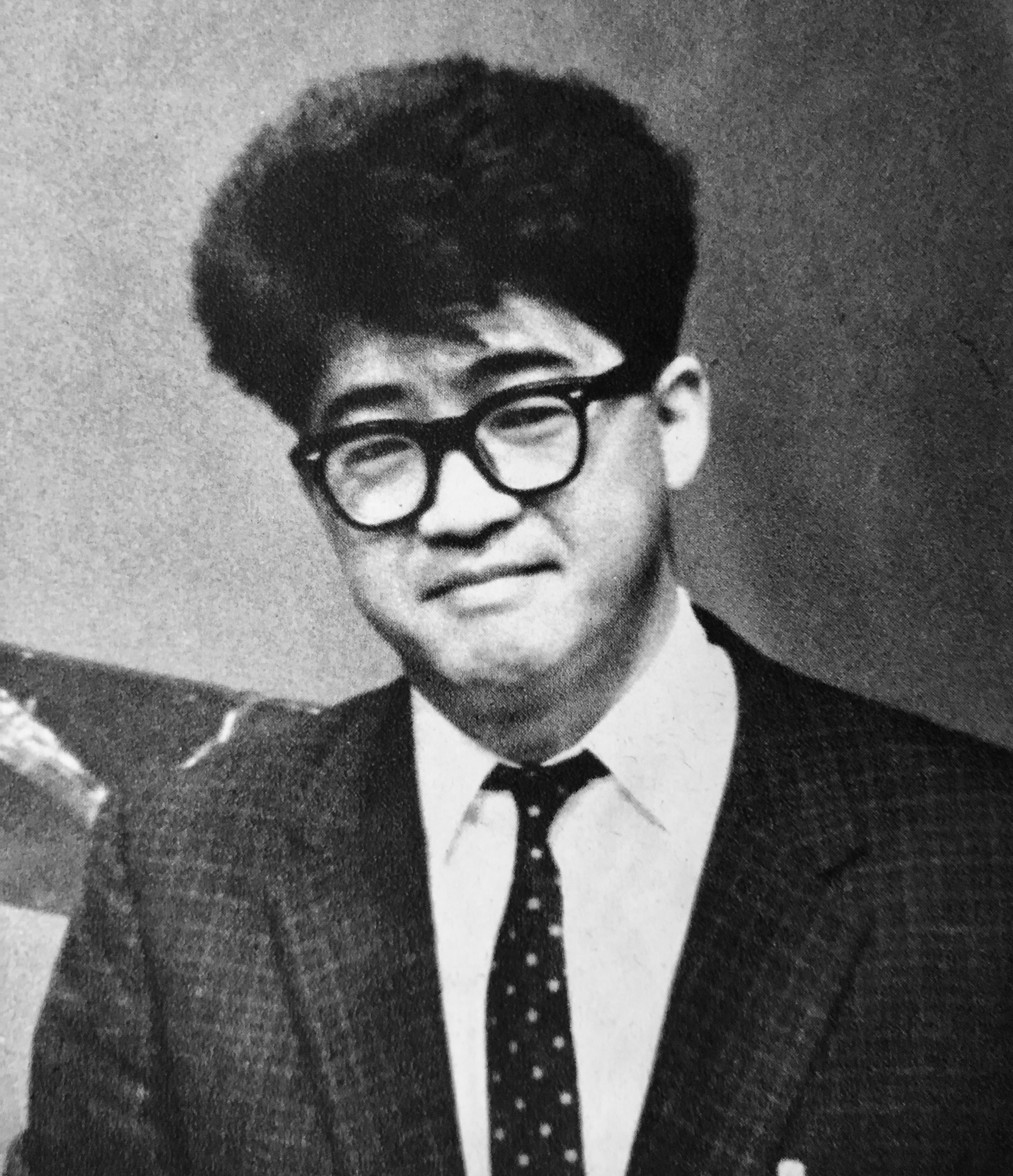
- Kōbō Abe in 1967
- Born: Kimifusa Abe (安部 公房 Abe Kimifusa); March 7, 1924; Kita, Tokyo, Japan
- Died: January 22, 1993 (aged 68); Tokyo, Japan
- Education: Seijo High School; University of Tokyo
- Occupation: Writer
- Spouse: Machi Abe
- Children: Neri Abe
- Writing career
- Language: Japanese
- Genres: Absurdist fiction, surrealism
- Notable works: The Woman in the Dunes; The Face of Another; The Box Man
- Notable awards: Akutagawa Prize; Yomiuri Prize; Tanizaki Prize
- Movement: Modernism

Kimifusa Abe (安部 公房, Abe Kimifusa; March 7, 1924 – January 22, 1993), known by his pen name Kōbō Abe (安部 公房, Abe Kōbō), was a Japanese writer, playwright and director. His 1962 novel The Woman in the Dunes was made into an award-winning film by Hiroshi Teshigahara in 1964. Abe has often been compared to Franz Kafka for his modernist sensibilities and his surreal, often nightmarish explorations of individuals in contemporary society. He died aged 68 of heart failure in Tokyo after a brief illness.

== Biography ==
Abe was born on March 7, 1924 in Kita, Tokyo, Japan and grew up in Mukden (now Shenyang) in Manchuria. Abe's family was in Tokyo at the time due to his father's year of medical research in Tokyo. His mother had been raised in Hokkaido, while he experienced childhood in Manchuria. This triplicate assignment of origin was influential to Abe, who told Nancy Shields in a 1978 interview, "I am essentially a man without a hometown. This may be what lies behind the 'hometown phobia' that runs in the depth of my feelings. All things that are valued for their stability offend me." As a child, Abe was interested in insect-collecting, mathematics, and reading. His favorite authors were Fyodor Dostoyevsky, Martin Heidegger, Karl Jaspers, Franz Kafka, Friedrich Nietzsche, and Edgar Allan Poe.

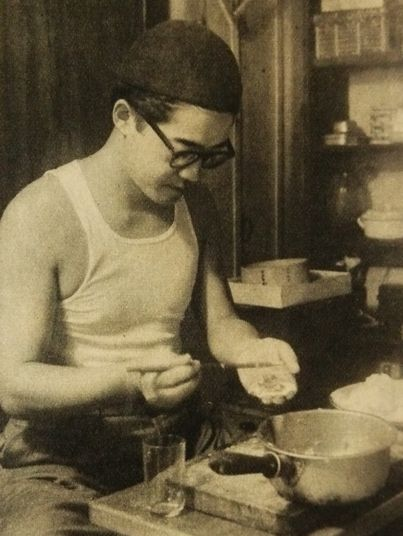
Abe prepares gyōza

Abe returned to Tokyo briefly in April 1940 to study at Seijo High School, but a lung condition forced his return to Mukden, where he read Jaspers, Heidegger, Dostoyevsky, and Edmund Husserl. Abe began to study medicine at Tokyo Imperial University in 1943, partially out of respect for his father, but also because "[t]hose students who specialized in medicine were exempted from becoming soldiers. My friends who chose the humanities were killed in the war." He returned to Manchuria around the end of World War II. Specifically, Abe left the Tokyo University Medical School in October 1944, returning to his father's clinic in Mukden. That winter, his father died of eruptive typhus. Returning to Tokyo with his father's ashes, Abe reentered the medical school. Abe started writing novellas and short stories during his last year in university. He graduated in 1948 with a medical degree, once joking that he was allowed to graduate only on the condition that he would not practice.

In 1945 Abe married Machi Yamada, an artist and stage director, and the couple saw successes within their fields in similar time frames. Initially, they lived in an old barracks within a bombed-out area of the city center. Abe sold pickles and charcoal on the street to pay their bills. The couple joined a number of artistic study groups, such as Yoru no Kai (Group of the Night or The Night Society) and Nihon Bungaku Gakko (Japanese Literary School). Their daughter, Abe Neri, was born in 1954.

As the postwar period progressed, Abe's stance as an intellectual pacifist led to his joining the Japanese Communist Party, with which he worked to organize laborers in poor parts of Tokyo. Soon after receiving the Akutagawa Prize in 1951, Abe began to feel the constraints of the Communist Party's rules and regulations alongside doubts about what meaningful artistic works could be created in the genre of "socialist realism." By 1956, Abe began writing in solidarity with the Polish workers who were protesting against their Communist government, drawing the Communist Party's ire. The criticism reaffirmed his stance: "The Communist Party put pressure on me to change the content of the article and apologize. But I refused. I said I would never change my opinion on the matter. This was my first break with the Party." (Note: Though see the different analysis in Schnellbächer, who states that Abe's "evaluation of the insurrections in Poland and Hungary is curiously helpless, in both cases mirroring the official communist reading") The next year, Abe traveled to Eastern Europe for the 20th Convention of the Soviet Communist Party. He saw little of interest there, but the arts gave him some solace. He visited Kafka's house in Prague, read Rilke and Karel Čapek, reflected on his idol Lu Xun, and was moved by a Mayakovsky play in Brno.

The Soviet invasion of Hungary in 1956 disgusted Abe. He attempted to leave the Communist Party, but resignations from the party were not accepted at the time. In 1960, he participated in the Anpo Protests against revision of the US-Japan Security Treaty as part of the pan-ideological Young Japan Society. He later wrote a play about the protests, The Day the Stones Speak, which was staged several times in Japan and China in 1960 and 1961. In the summer of 1961, Abe joined a group of other authors in criticizing the cultural policies of the Communist Party. He was forcibly expelled from the party the following year. His political activity came to an end in 1967 in the form of a statement published by himself, Yukio Mishima, Yasunari Kawabata, and Jun Ishikawa, protesting the treatment of writers, artists, and intellectuals in Communist China. According to translator John Nathan, this statement led to the falling-out between Abe and fellow writer Kenzaburō Ōe.

His experiences in Manchuria were also deeply influential on his writing, imprinting terrors and fever dreams that became surrealist hallmarks of his works. In his recollections of Mukden, these markers are evident: "The fact is, it may not have been trash in the center of the marsh at all; it may have been crows. I do have a memory of thousands of crows flying up from the swamp at dusk, as if the surface of the swamp were being lifted up into the air." The trash of the marsh was a truth of life, as were the crows, yet Abe's recollections of them tie them distinctively. Further experiences with the swamp centered around its use as a staking ground for condemned criminals with "[their] heads—now food for crows—appearing suddenly out of the darkness and disappearing again, terrified and attracted to us." These ideas are present in much of Abe's work.

== Career ==
Abe was first published as a poet in 1947 with Mumei-shishū ("Poems of an unknown poet"), which he paid for himself, and as a novelist the following year with Owarishi michi no shirube ni ("The Road Sign at the End of the Street"), which established his reputation. When he received the Akutagawa Prize in 1951, his ability to continue publishing was confirmed. Though he did much work as an avant-garde novelist and playwright, it was not until the publication of The Woman in the Dunes in 1962 that Abe won widespread international acclaim. In 1970, Abe's Inter Ice Age 4 became the first Japanese science fiction novel to appear in English, in a translation by American scholar E. Dale Saunders.

In the 1960s, he collaborated with Japanese director Hiroshi Teshigahara on the film adaptations of The Pitfall, Woman in the Dunes, The Face of Another, and The Man Without a Map. Woman in the Dunes received widespread critical acclaim and was released only four months after Abe was expelled from the Japanese Communist Party.

In 1971, he founded the Abe Studio, an acting studio in Tokyo. Until the end of the decade, he trained performers and directed plays. The decision to found the studio came two years after he first directed his own work in 1969, a production of The Man Who Turned Into A Stick. The production's sets were designed by Abe's wife Machi, and Hisashi Igawa starred. Abe had become dissatisfied with ability of the theatre to materialize the abstract, reducing it to a passive medium. Until 1979, he wrote, directed, and produced 14 plays at the Abe Studio. He also published two novels, Box Man (1973) and Secret Rendezvous (1977), alongside a series of essays, musical scores, and photographic exhibits. The Seibu Theater, an avant-garde theater in the new department store Parco, was allegedly established in 1973 specifically for Abe, though many other artists were given the chance to use it. The Abe Studio production of The Glasses of Love Are Rose Colored (1973) opened there. Later, the entirety of the Seibu Museum was used to present one of Abe's photographic works, An Exhibition of Images: I.

The Abe Studio provided a foil for much of the contemporary scene in Japanese theater, contrasting with the Haiyuza's conventional productions, opting to focus on dramatic, as opposed to physical, expression. It was a safe space for young performers, whom Abe would often recruit from the Toho Gakuen College in Chofu City, on the outskirts of Tokyo, where he taught. The average age of the performers in the studio was about 27 throughout the decade, as members left and fresh faces were brought in. Abe "deftly" handled issues arising from difference in stage experience.

In 1977 Abe was elected a Foreign Honorary Member of the American Academy of Arts and Sciences.

== Awards ==
Among the honors Abe received were the Akutagawa Prize in 1951 for The Crime of S. Karuma, the Yomiuri Prize in 1962 for The Woman in the Dunes, and the Tanizaki Prize in 1967 for the play Friends. Kenzaburō Ōe credited Abe and other modern Japanese authors for "[creating] the way to the Nobel Prize", which he himself won. Abe was mentioned multiple times as a possible recipient, but his early death precluded that possibility.

== Bibliography ==
=== Novels ===
Year	Japanese Title	English Title	Translations available	Notes
1948	終りし道の標に; Owarishi michi no shirube ni	At the Guidepost at the End of the Road		
1954	飢餓同盟; Kiga doumei	Starving Unions		
1957	けものたちは故郷をめざす; Kemono tachi wa kokyou wo mezasu	Beasts Head for Home	Richard F. Calichman	
1959	第四間氷期; Dai-Yon Kampyōki	Inter Ice Age 4	E. Dale Saunders	Illustrated by Abe Machi
1960	石の眼; Ishi no me	Stony Eyes		
1962	砂の女; Suna no onna	The Woman in the Dunes	E. Dale Saunders	Adapted into an international film
1964	他人の顔; Tanin no kao	The Face of Another	E. Dale Saunders	Adapted into a film by the same title
1964	榎本武揚; Enomoto Takeaki	The Traitor	Mark Gibeau	Commissioned conversion to a play by theatrical company Kumo and directed by Hiroshi Akutagawa Mixed reviews: Keene preferred the novel to the play, while Oe considered it "genuinely new."
1966	人間そっくり; Ningen sokkuri	The Double of Human Being		
1967	燃えつきた地図; Moetsukita chizu	The Ruined Map	E. Dale Saunders	
1973	箱男; Hako otoko	The Box Man	E. Dale Saunders	
1977	密会; Mikkai	Secret Rendezvous	Juliet Winters Carpenter, 1979	
1984	方舟さくら丸; Hakobune sakura maru	The Ark Sakura	Juliet Winters Carpenter, 1988	
1991	カンガルー・ノート; Kangaruu noto	Kangaroo Notebook	Maryellen Toman Mori	
1994	飛ぶ男; Tobu otoko	The Flying Man		Incomplete

=== Collected short stories ===
Year	Japanese Title	English Title	Translations available	Notes
1949	唖むすめ; Oshimusume	"The Deaf Girl"	Andrew Horvat	Collected in Four Stories by Kobo Abe
1949	デンドロカカリヤ; Dendorokakariya	"Dendrocacalia"	Juliet Winters Carpenter	Collected in Beyond the Curve
1949	夢の逃亡; Yume no toubou	"The Dream Escape"		
1950	赤い繭; Akai mayu	"The Red Cocoon"	Lane Dunlop	Collected in A Late chrysanthemum: Twenty-One Stories from the Japanese
1950	洪水; Kouzui	"The Flood"	Lane Dunlop	Collected in A Late chrysanthemum: Twenty-One Stories from the Japanese
1950	棒 Bou	"The Stick"	Lane Dunlop	Collected in A Late chrysanthemum: Twenty-One Stories from the Japanese
1951	魔法のチョーク; Mahou no chouku	"The Magic Chalk"	Alison Kibrick	Collected in The Showa Anthology: Modern Japanese Short Stories
1951	壁―S・カルマ氏の犯罪; Kabe―S・Karuma shi no hanzai	The Wall ― The Crime of S. Karma	Juliet Winters Carpenter	Winner of the Akutagawa Prize Excerpt collected in Beyond the Curve
1951	手 Te	"Hand"	Ted Mack	Appears in Columbia: A Journal of Literature and Art, No. 27 (Winter 1996–97), pp. 50–57
1951	闖入者; Chinnyusha	"Intruders"	Juliet Winters Carpenter	Collected in Beyond the Curve
1951	詩人の生涯; Shijin no Shougai	"The Life of a Poet"	Juliet Winters Carpenter	Collected in Beyond the Curve
1951	飢えた皮膚; Ueta hihu	"The Starving Skin"		
1952	ノアの方舟; Noa no hakobune	"Noah's Ark"	Juliet Winters Carpenter	Collected in Beyond the Curve
1952	水中都市; Suichu toshi	"The Underwater City"		
1954	犬 Inu	"The Dog"	Andrew Horvat	Collected in Four Stories by Kobo Abe
1954	変形の記録; Henkei no kiroku	"Record of a Transformation"	Juliet Winters Carpenter	Collected in Beyond the Curve
1954	Shinda musume ga utatta	"Song of a Dead Girl"	Stuart A. Harrington	Collected in The Mother of Dreams and Other Short Stories: Portrayals of Women in Modern Japanese Fiction
1956	R62号の発明; R62 gou no hatumei	"Inventions by No. R62"		
1957	誘惑者; Yuwakusha	"Beguiled"	Juliet Winters Carpenter	Collected in Beyond the Curve
1957	夢の兵士; Yume no heishi	"The Dream Soldier"	First translation, 1973 by Andrew Horvat; Second translation, 1991 by Juliet Winters Carpenter	First translation collected in Four Stories by Kobo Abe; Second translation collected in Beyond the Curve
1957	鉛の卵; Namari no tamago	"The Egg of Pb"		
1958	使者; Shisha	"The Special Envoy"	Juliet Winters Carpenter	Collected in Beyond the Curve
1960	賭け; Kake	"The Bet"	Juliet Winters Carpenter	Collected in Beyond the Curve
1961	無関係な死; Mukankei na shi	"An Irrelevant Death"	Juliet Winters Carpenter	Collected in Beyond the Curve
1964	時の崖; Toki no gake	"The Cliff of Time"	Andrew Horvat	Collected in Four Stories by Kobo Abe. Adapted into a short film in 1971 starring Hisashi Igawa that was directed by Abe himself.
1966	カーブの向う; Kabu no mukou	"Beyond the Curve"	Juliet Winters Carpenter	First collection published in English

=== Plays ===
Year	Japanese Title	English Title	Translations available	Notes
	時間の崖; Jikan no gake	The Cliff of Time	Donald Keene	Collected in The Man Who Turned Into A Stick: Three Related Plays
	スーツケース; Sūtsukēsu	Suitcase	Donald Keene	Collected in The Man Who Turned Into A Stick: Three Related Plays
1955	制服; Seifuku	Uniforms		
1955	どれい狩り; Dorei gari	Slave Hunting		
1955	快速船; Kaisoku sen	The Speedy Ship		
1957	棒になった男; Bou ni natta otoko	The Man Who Turned Into A Stick	Donald Keene	Collected in The Man Who Turned Into A Stick: Three Related Plays The 1969 production was the first time Abe directed his own work. His wife designed the set.
1958	幽霊はここにいる; Yuurei wa koko ni iru	The Ghost Is Here	Donald Keene	Collected in Three Plays by Kōbō Abe Award-winning production by Koreya Senda Well received in East Germany
1965	おまえにも罪がある; Omae nimo tsumi ga aru	You, Too, Are Guilty	Ted T. Takaya	Collected in Modern Japanese Drama: An Anthology
1967	友達; Tomodachi	Friends	Donald Keene	Performed in English in Honolulu; Akutagawa Award winner 1967 Adapted into a film in 1988, directed by Kjell-Åke Andersson
1967	榎本武揚; Enomoto Takeaki	Takeaki Enomoto		Alt. translation: Enomoto Buyo Directed by the son of Ryūnosuke Akutagawa, "father of the Japanese short story"
1971	未必の故意; Mihitsu no koi	Involuntary Homicide	Donald Keene	Collected in Three Plays by Kōbō Abe
1971	ガイド・ブック; Gaido bukku	Guide Book		
1973	愛の眼鏡は色ガラス; Ai no megane wa iro garasu	Loving Glasses Are Colored Ones		
1974	緑色のストッキング; Midori iro no sutokkingu	Green Stockings	Donald Keene	Collected in Three Plays by Kōbō Abe
1975	ウエー（新どれい狩り） Uē (Shin dorei gari)	Ue (Slave Hunting, New Version), The Animal Hunter	James R. Brandon	
1976	案内人GUIDE BOOK II; Annai nin	The Guide Man, GUIDE BOOK II		
1977	水中都市GUIDE BOOK III; Suichu toshi	The Underwater City, GUIDE BOOK III		
1978	S・カルマ氏の犯罪; S・Karuma shi no hanzai	The Crime of S. Karuma		
1979	仔象は死んだ; Kozou wa shinda	An Elephant Calf Is Dead		Adapted into a short film that was directed by Abe himself in the same year.

=== Essays ===
Year	Japanese Title	English Title	Translations available	Notes
1944	詩と詩人 (意識と無意識); Shi to shijin [Ishiki to muishiki]	Poetry and Poets (Consciousness and the Unconscious)	Richard F. Calichman	Collected in The Frontier Within: Essays by Abe Kōbō
1954	文学における理論と実践; Bungaku ni okeru riron to jissen	Theory and Practice in Literature	Richard F. Calichman	Collected in The Frontier Within: Essays by Abe Kōbō
1955	猛獣の心に計算機の手を:文学とは何か; Mōjū no kokoro ni keisanki no te wo: Bungaku to ha nanika	The Hand of a Calculator with the Heart of a Beast: What Is Literature?	Richard F. Calichman	Collected in The Frontier Within: Essays by Abe Kōbō
1957	アメリカ発見; Amerika hakken	Discovering America	Richard F. Calichman	Collected in The Frontier Within: Essays by Abe Kōbō
1960	映像は言語の壁を破壊するか; Eizō ha gengo no kabe wo hakai suru ka	Does the Visual Image Destroy the Walls of Language?	Richard F. Calichman	Collected in The Frontier Within: Essays by Abe Kōbō
1960	芸術の革命:芸術運動の理論; Geijutsu no kakumei: Geijutsu undō no riron	Artistic Revolution: Theory of the Art Movement	Richard F. Calichman	Collected in The Frontier Within: Essays by Abe Kōbō
1965	現代における教育の可能性:人間存在の本質に触れて; Gendai ni okeru kyōiku no kanōsei: Ningen sonzai no honshitsu ni furete	Possibilities for Education Today: On the Essence of Human Existence	Richard F. Calichman	Collected in The Frontier Within: Essays by Abe Kōbō
1966	隣人を超えるもの; Rinjin wo koeru mono	Beyond the Neighbor	Richard F. Calichman	Collected in The Frontier Within: Essays by Abe Kōbō
1968	ミリタリールック; Miritarī rukku	The Military Look	Richard F. Calichman	Collected in The Frontier Within: Essays by Abe Kōbō
1968	異端のパスポート; Itan no pasupōto	Passport of Heresy	Richard F. Calichman	Collected in The Frontier Within: Essays by Abe Kōbō
1968	内なる辺境; Uchi naru henkyō	The Frontier Within	Richard F. Calichman	Collected in The Frontier Within: Essays by Abe Kōbō
1969	続:内なる辺境; Zoku: Uchi naru henkyō	The Frontier Within, Part II	Richard F. Calichman	Collected in The Frontier Within: Essays by Abe Kōbō
1975	笑う月; Warau tsuki	The Laughing Moon		
1981	桜は異端諮問間の紋章 Sakura wa itan shinmonkan no monshō	The Dark Side of the Cherry Blossoms	Donald Keene	Published in The Washington Post, The Guardian, and The Asahi Shinbun

=== Poetry ===
Year	Japanese Title	English Title	Translations available	Notes
1947	無名詩集; Mumei shishu	Poems of an Unknown Poet		
1978	人さらい; Hito sarai	Kidnap		
