= List of compositions by Tōru Takemitsu =

Below is a sortable list of compositions by Tōru Takemitsu. The works are categorized by genre, date of composition, titles and scoring.

Scores by Takemitsu are published by Ongaku No Tomo Sha, C.F. Peters, Éditions Salabert, Schott Japan, and Universal Edition.

Genre	Date	Japanese title (original title)	English title	Scoring	Notes
Orchestral	1957	弦楽のためのレクイエム	Requiem	for string orchestra	
Orchestral	1958	ソリチュード・ソノール	Solitude Sonore	for orchestra	
Orchestral	1961	樹の曲	Music of Tree	for orchestra	
Orchestral	1962	コロナII	Corona II	for string orchestra	uses graphic notation; written in collaboration with Kōhei Sugiura
Orchestral	1964	地平線のドーリア	The Dorian Horizon	for 17 strings	
Orchestral	1967	グリーン	Green	for orchestra	
Orchestral	1971	冬	Winter	for orchestra	
Orchestral	1973, 1979	秋庭歌一具	In an Autumn Garden	for gagaku orchestra	
Orchestral	1976	マージナリア	Marginalia	for orchestra	
Orchestral	1977	鳥は星型の庭に降りる	A Flock Descends into the Pentagonal Garden	for orchestra	
Orchestral	1981	ア・ウェイ・ア・ローン II	A Way a Lone II	for string orchestra	
Orchestral	1981	夢の時	Dreamtime	for orchestra	
Orchestral	1982	雨ぞふる	Rain Coming	for chamber orchestra	
Orchestral	1982	星・島(スター・アイル)	Star-Isle	for orchestra	
Orchestral	1983		Lacrima	for string orchestra	
Orchestral	1985	夢窓	Dream/Window	for orchestra	
Orchestral	1988	トゥウィル・バイ・トワイライト – モートン・フェルドマンの追憶に	Twill by Twilight: In Memory of Morton Feldman	for orchestra	composed in memory of composer Morton Feldman
Orchestral	1988	トゥリー・ライン	Tree Line	for chamber orchestra	early title: 並木 (Namiki)
Orchestral	1988		For Lenny's Birthday, Variations on a Theme by Bernstein	for orchestra	1 of the 8 variations on "New York, New York, It's a Wonderful Town" from On the Town and other themes written for Leonard Bernstein's 70th birthday; collaborative composition with Luciano Berio, Leon Kirchner, John Williams, Jacob Druckman, et al.
Orchestral	1990	ヴィジョンズ: 1. 神秘; 2. 閉じた眼	Visions: 1. Mystère; 2. Les Yeux clos	for orchestra	
Orchestral	1991	ハウ・スロー・ザ・ウィンド	How Slow the Wind	for orchestra	
Orchestral	1992	セレモニアル – An Autumn Ode –	Ceremonial: An Autumn Ode	for orchestra with shō	
Orchestral	1992	系図 – 若い人たちのための音楽詩 –	Family Tree: Musical Verses for Young People	for narrator and orchestra	words by Shuntarō Tanikawa
Orchestral	1993	群島S.	Archipelago S.	for 21 players in 5 groups	Group A: oboe (oboe d'amore), violin, viola, violoncello, double bass, harp, percussion (1 player); Group B: horn I, horn II, trumpet, trombone I, trombone II; Group C: flute (alto flute), bassoon, violin, viola, violoncello, celesta, percussion (1 player); Group D: clarinet Group E: clarinet
Orchestral	1994	精霊の庭	Spirit Garden	for orchestra	
Orchestral	1994, 1995	三つの映画音楽: 1. 『ホゼー・トレス』; 2. 『黒い雨』; 3. 『他人の顔』	Three Film Scores: 1. "José Torres"; 2. "Black Rain"; 3. "The Face of Another"	for string orchestra	
Concertante	1959	シーン	Scene	for cello and string orchestra	also for cello and piano
Concertante	1964	テクスチュアズ	Textures	for piano and orchestra	incorporated into Arc, Part II
Concertante	1963–1966; 1963; 1966; 1963	弧（アーク） 第1部: 1. パイル; 2. ソリチュード; 3. Your Love and the Crossing	Arc, Part I: 1. Pile; 2. Solitude; 3. Your Love and the Crossing	for piano and orchestra	revised in 1976
Concertante	1964–1966; 1964; 1966; 1966	弧（アーク） 第2部: 1. テクスチュアズ; 2. リフレクション; 3. コーダ	Arc, Part II: 1. Textures; 2. Reflection; 3. Coda: Shall Begin from the End	for piano and orchestra	revised in 1976
Concertante	1967	ノヴェンバー・ステップス	November Steps	for biwa, shakuhachi and orchestra	
Concertante	1968	アステリズム	Asterism	for piano and orchestra	
Concertante	1970	ユーカリプス I	Eucalypts I	for flute, oboe, harp and string orchestra	
Concertante	1971	カシオペア	Cassiopeia	for percussion solo and orchestra	
Concertante	1973	秋	Autumn	for biwa, shakuhachi and orchestra	
Concertante	1974	ジティマルヤ	Gitimalya: Bouquet of Songs	for marimba and orchestra	
Concertante	1974–1975	カトレーン	Quatrain	for clarinet, violin, cello, piano and orchestra	
Concertante	1980	遠い呼び声の彼方へ！	Far Calls. Coming, Far!	for violin and orchestra	
Concertante	1981	海へ II: 1. 夜 2. 白鯨; 3. 鱈岬	Toward the Sea II: 1. The Night; 2. Moby Dick; 3. Cape Cod	for alto flute, harp and string orchestra	
Concertante	1983	夢の縁へ	To the Edge of Dream	for guitar and orchestra	
Concertante	1984	虹へ向かって、パルマ	Vers, l'arc-en-ciel, Palma	for oboe d'amore, guitar and orchestra	
Concertante	1984	オリオンとプレアデス	Orion and Pleiades	for cello and orchestra	
Concertante	1984	リヴァラン	Riverrun	for piano and orchestra	
Concertante	1971–1986	ジェモー	Gémeaux	for oboe, trombone, 2 orchestras and 2 conductors	
Concertante	1987	ウォーター・ドリーミング	I Hear the Water Dreaming	for flute and orchestra	
Concertante	1987	ノスタルジア – アンドレイ・タルコフスキーの追憶に –	Nostalghia: In Memory of Andrej Tarkovskij	for violin and string orchestra	composed in memory of filmmaker Andrei Tarkovsky
Concertante	1987	夕暮れに	Yūgure ni	for orchestra	arrangement
Concertante	1989	ア・ストリング・アラウンド・オータム	A String Around Autumn	for viola and orchestra	
Concertante	1990	フロム・ミー・フロウズ・ホワット・ユー・コール・タイム	From me flows what you call Time	for 5 percussionists and orchestra	
Concertante	1991	ファンタズマ/カントス	Fantasma/Cantos	for clarinet and orchestra	winner of the 1994 Grawemeyer Award for Music Composition
Concertante	1991	夢の引用 – Say Sea, take me! –	Quotation the Dream: Say Sea, Take Me!	for 2 pianos and orchestra	
Concertante	1994	ファンタズマ/カントス II	Fantasma/Cantos II	for trombone and orchestra	
Concertante	1995	スペクトラル・カンティクル	Spectral Canticle	for violin, guitar and orchestra	
Concertante	1995	ミロの彫刻のように	Comme la Sculpture de Miró	for flute, harp and orchestra	incomplete; Takemitsu's last work inspired by the sculpture of Joan Miró
Chamber music	1951, 1989	妖精の距離	Distance de fée	for violin and piano	
Chamber music	1955	室内協奏曲	Concerto de chambre	for 13 instruments	
Chamber music	1958	ソン・カリグラフィ I	Le Son-calligraphié I	for 4 violins, 2 violas and 2 cellos	
Chamber music	1958	ソン・カリグラフィ II	Le Son-calligraphié II	for 4 violins, 2 violas and 2 cellos	
Chamber music	1959	シーン	Scene	for cello and piano	also for cello and string orchestra
Chamber music	1959–1960	マスク	Masque	for 2 flutes	
Chamber music	1960	ソン・カリグラフィ III	Le Son-calligraphié III	for 4 violins, 2 violas and 2 cellos	
Chamber music	1960	ランドスケープ	Landscape	for 2 violins, viola and cello	
Chamber music	1961	リング	Ring	for flute, terz guitar and lute	
Chamber music	1961	不良少年	Bad Boy	for 3 guitars	arranged for 2 guitars by Norio Sato
Chamber music	1962	サクリファイス	Sacrifice	for alto flute, lute and vibraphone with crotales	
Chamber music	1964	一柳慧のためのブルー・オーロラ	Blue Aurora for Toshi Ichiyanagi		chance operation composition for Toshi Ichiyanagi
Chamber music	1965	ソナント	Sonant	for 2 flutes, violin, cello, guitar and 2 bandoneons	revised as Valeria in 1969
Chamber music	1965, 1969	ヴァレリア	Valeria	for violin, cello, guitar, electronic organ and 2 piccolos	revised version of Sonant (1965)
Chamber music	1966	悲歌	Hika (Elegy)	for violin and piano	
Chamber music	1966	エクリプス<蝕>	Eclipse	for biwa and shakuhachi	
Chamber music	1968	クロス・トーク	Cross Talk	for bandoneón and tape	
Chamber music	1969	スタンザ I	Stanza I	for guitar, harp, piano (also celesta), vibraphone and female voice (soprano)	
Chamber music	1970	四季	Seasons	for 4 percussion players, or 1 percussion player and tape	also version for traditional Japanese musical instruments
Chamber music	1967–1971	ムナーリ・バイ・ムナーリ	Munari by Munari	for percussion	
Chamber music	1971	声（ヴォイス）	Voice	for flute	
Chamber music	1971	ユーカリプスII	Eucalypts II	for flute, oboe and harp	
Chamber music	1971	スタンザII	Stanza II	for harp and tape	
Chamber music	1972	ディスタンス	Distance	for oboe and shō ad libitum	
Chamber music	1973	旅	Voyage	for 3 biwa	
Chamber music	1974	ガーデン・レイン	Garden Rain	for brass ensemble (horn, 4 trumpets, 4 trombones, tuba)	
Chamber music	1974	フォリオス	Folios: 1. Folio I 2. Folio II; 3. Folio III	for guitar	
Chamber music	1974–1977	ギターのための12のうた: 1. ロンドンデリーの歌; 2. オーバー・ザ・レインボー; 3. サマータイム; 4. 早春賦; 5. 失われた恋; 6. 星の世界; 7. シークレット・ラヴ; 8. ヒア・ゼア・アンド・エヴリウェア; 9. ミッシェル; 10. ヘイ・ジュード; 11. イエスタデイ; 12. インターナショナル	12 Songs for Guitar: 1. Londonderry Air; 2. Over the Rainbow; 3. Summertime; 4. A Song of Early Spring; 5. Amours Perdues; 6. What a Friend; 7. Secret Love; 8. Here, There and Everywhere; 9. Michelle; 10. Hey Jude; 11. Yesterday; 12. The International	for guitar	transcriptions 1. Irish folk song 2. music by Harold Arlen; 3. music by George Gershwin; 4. music by Akira Nakada (中田章); 5. music by Joseph Kosma; 6. music by Charles Crozat Converse; 7. music by Sammy Fain; 8.~11. music by The Beatles: Paul McCartney and John Lennon; 12. music by Pierre De Geyter
Chamber music	1975	星たちの息子 – 第一幕への前奏曲『天職』 –	Le Fils des étoiles: Prélude du 1er acte "La Vocation"	arrangement for flute and harp	original music by Erik Satie
Chamber music	1976	ブライス	Bryce	for flute, 2 harps and 2 percussion players	
Chamber music	1976	ウェイブス<波>	Waves	for clarinet solo, horn, 2 trombones and bass drum	
Chamber music	1977	カトレーンII	Quatrain II	for clarinet, violin, cello and piano	
Chamber music	1977–1978	ウォーターウェイズ	Waterways	for violin, cello, clarinet, piano, 2 harps and 2 vibraphones	
Chamber music	1980	ア・ウェイ・ア・ローン	A Way a Lone	for 2 violins, viola and cello	
Chamber music	1981	海へ: 1. 夜 2. 白鯨; 3. 鱈岬	Toward the Sea: 1. The Night; 2. Moby Dick; 3. Cape Cod	for alto flute and guitar (or harp)	
Chamber music	1981	雨の樹	Rain Tree	for 3 percussion players (or 3 keyboard players)	after Kenzaburō Ōe's 1982 serial novel Women Listening to the Rain Tree (「雨の木」を聴く女たち)
Chamber music	1981, 1989	海へ III: 1. 夜 2. 白鯨; 3. 鱈岬	Toward the Sea III: 1. The Night; 2. Moby Dick; 3. Cape Cod	for alto flute and harp	
Chamber music	1982	雨の呪文	Rain Spell	for flute (also alto flute), clarinet, harp, piano and vibraphone	
Chamber music	1982	クロス・ハッチ	Cross Hatch	for marimba and vibraphone (or 2 keyboard instruments)	
Chamber music	1983	ラスト・ワルツ	The Last Waltz	for guitar	arrangement
Chamber music	1983	十一月の霧と菊の彼方から	From Far beyond Chrysanthemums and November Fog	for violin and piano	
Chamber music	1983	揺れる鏡の夜明け: 1. 秋 2. 過ぎてゆく鳥; 3. 影の中で; 4. 揺れる鏡	Rocking Mirror Daybreak: 1. Autumn; 2. Passing Bird; 3. In the Shadows; 4. Rocking Mirror	for 2 violins	
Chamber music	1984	オリオン	Orion	for cello and piano	
Chamber music	1986	アントゥル・タン	Entre-temps	for oboe, 2 violins, viola and cello	
Chamber music	1987	シグナルズ・フロム・ヘヴン – Two Antiphonal Fanfares –: 1. デイ･シグナル; 2. ナイト･シグナル	Signals from Heaven, Two Antiphonal Fanfares: 1. Day Signal; 2. Night Signal	for 2 horns, piccolo trumpet, 4 trumpets (also 2 cornets), 4 trombones and tuba	
Chamber music	1987	ヒロシマという名の少年	A Boy Named Hiroshima	for 2 guitars	
Chamber music	1987	すべては薄明のなかで – ギターのための四つの小品 –	All in Twilight, 4 Pieces	for guitar	written for Julian Bream
Chamber music	1989	巡り – イサム・ノグチの追憶に –	Itinerant: In Memory of Isamu Noguchi	for flute	composed in memory of Japanese American artist Isamu Noguchi
Chamber music	1991	ギターのための小品 – シルヴァーノ・ブソッティの60歳の誕生日に –	A Piece for Guitar: For the 60th Birthday of Sylvano Bussotti	for guitar	Sylvano Bussotti
Chamber music	1992	そして、それが風であることを知った	And Then I Knew 'Twas Wind	for flute, viola and harp	
Chamber music	1993	ビトゥイーン・タイズ	Between Tides	for violin, cello and piano	
Chamber music	1993	エキノクス	Equinox	for guitar	
Chamber music	1993	秋のうた	Herbstlied (Autumn Song)	for clarinet, 2 violins, viola and cello	arrangement from The Seasons, Op. 37a, by Tchaikovsky
Chamber music	1993	枯葉	Les Feuilles mortes (Autumn Leaves)	for 2 violins, viola and cello	arrangement of the song by Joseph Kosma
Chamber music	1994	鳥が道に降りてきた	A Bird Came down the Walk	for viola and piano	
Chamber music	1994	径 – ヴィトルド・ルトスワフスキの追憶に –	Paths: In Memoriam Witold Lutosławski	for trumpet	composed in memory of composer Witold Lutosławski
Chamber music	1995	エア	Air	for flute	last published work
Chamber music	1995	森の中で – ギターのための三つの小品 –: 1. ウェインスコット・ポンド－コーネリア・フォスの絵画から－; 2. ローズデール; 3. ミュアー・ウッズ	In the Woods, 3 Pieces: 1. Wainscot Pond – after a Painting by Cornelia Foss; 2. Rosedale; 3. Muir Woods	for guitar	
Keyboard	1948?	かけひ	Kakehi (Conduit)	for piano	incomplete
Keyboard	1948?	箏歌	Sōka	for piano	incomplete
Keyboard	1948?	クラヴサンのために	For Harpsichord (Clavecin no tame ni)	for harpsichord	
Keyboard	1948	二つのメロディ	2 Melodies	for piano	incomplete
Keyboard	1949	二つの小品	2 Pieces	for piano	incomplete
Keyboard	1948–1949	ロマンス	Romance	for piano	
Keyboard	1950	二つのレント	Lento in due movimenti: 1. Adagio; 2. Lento misteriosamente	for piano	revised as Litany in 1989
Keyboard	1952		At the Circus	for piano	
Keyboard	1952, 1959; 1952; 1959; 1959	遮られない休息: 1. ゆっくりと、悲しく語りかけるように; 2. 静かに残酷な響きで; 3. 愛の歌	Uninterrupted Rest (Pause ininterrompue): 1. Slowly, Sadly and As If to Converse With; 2. Quietly and with a Cruel Reverberation; 3. A Song of Love	for piano	after a poem by Shūzō Takiguchi; also known as Uninterrupted Rest(s) and La Pause ininterrompue
Keyboard	1960	あわれみたまえ	Miserere	for piano	jazz composition
Keyboard	1960	愛して	Love Me	for piano	jazz composition
Keyboard	1961	ピアノ・ディスタンス	Piano Distance	for piano	
Keyboard	1962	ピアニストのためのコロナ	Corona for Pianist(s): 1. Study for Vibration; 2. Study for Intonation; 3. Study for Articulation; 4. Study for Expression; 5. Study for Conversation	for 1 or more pianos	uses graphic notation; written in collaboration with Kōhei Sugiura
Keyboard	1973	フォー・アウェイ	For Away	for piano	
Keyboard	1978	こどものためのピアノ小品: 1. 微風; 2. 雲	Piano Pieces for Children: 1. Breeze; 2. Clouds	for piano	
Keyboard	1979	閉じた眼 – 瀧口修造の追憶に –	Les Yeux clos: In Memory of Shuzo Takiguchi	for piano	composed in memory of Japanese poet Shūzō Takiguchi, inspired by Les Yeux clos of Odilon Redon
Keyboard	1982	雨の樹素描	Rain Tree Sketch	for piano	
Keyboard	1986	夢見る雨	Rain Dreaming	for harpsichord	
Keyboard	1988	閉じた眼 II	Les Yeux clos II	for piano	
Keyboard	1989	リタニ – マイケル・ヴァイナーの追憶に –	Litany: In Memory of Michael Vyner: 1. Adagio; 2. Lento misterioso	for piano	composed in memory of Michael Vyner; revision of Lento in due movimenti (1950)
Keyboard	1992	雨の樹素描 II – オリヴィエ・メシアンの追憶に –	Rain Tree Sketch II: In Memory of Olivier Messiaen	for piano	composed in memory of composer Olivier Messiaen
Keyboard	1992	ゴールデン・スランバーズ	Golden Slumbers	for piano	arrangement from Abbey Road by The Beatles
Choral	1953	美幌町町歌	Bihoro Song		City song for Bihoro, Hokkaidō; words by Kōichi Ōshita (大下孝一)
Choral	1961–1966	風の馬	Wind Horse: 1. Vocalise I 2. Spell of Fingers; 3. Vocalise II; 4. Vocalise III; 5. Legend of the Dining Table and Coda	for mixed chorus	
Choral	1963	三重県立四日市南高等学校校歌	Yokkaichi Minami High School Song, Yokkaichi, Mie		School song; words by Shuntarō Tanikawa
Choral	1963	三重県伊賀市上野西小学校校歌	Kamino Nishi Elementary School Song, Iga, Mie		School song; words by Keiji Hashimoto (橋本鶏二)
Choral	1969	クロッシング	Crossing: 1. According to What	for 2 orchestras with soloists (guitar, harp, piano/celeste, vibraphone) and female chorus	
Choral	1982	芝生	Grass	for male chorus	words by Shuntarō Tanikawa; English words by W. S. Merwin; commissioned by the Harvard Glee Club
Choral	1983	東村山市久米川東小学校校歌	Kumegawahigashi Elementary School Song, Higashimurayama, Tokyo		School song; words by Shuntarō Tanikawa
Choral	1987	手作り諺 – 四つのポップ・ソング –	Handmade Proverbs, 4 Pop Songs: 1. Your Eyes; 2. Three Bonzes; 3. Cinderella's Misfortune; 4. A Farewell Gift	for 6 male voices	words by Shūzō Takiguchi
Choral	1990	マイ・ウェイ・オブ・ライフ -マイケル・ヴァイナーの追憶に	My Way of Life: In Memory of Michael Vyner	for baritone, mixed chorus and orchestra	composed in memory of Michael Vyner
Choral	1991	秋葉学園歌	Akiba Gakuen Song		School song; words by Makoto Ooka
Vocal	1950s	MI・YO・TA	MI・YO・TA	for voice and piano	early melody for a film score that remained unused; completed in 1996 after Takemitsu's death by Toshirō Mayuzumi; words by Shuntarō Tanikawa
Vocal	1954	さようなら	Sayōnara	for voice and piano	words by Kuniharu Akiyama (秋山邦晴)
Vocal	1955	小さな部屋で	In a Small Room (Chiisana heya de)	for voice and piano	words by Akira Kawaji (川路明)
Vocal	1958	うたうだけ	I Just Sing (Utau dake)	for voice and piano	words by Shuntarō Tanikawa
Vocal	1958	黒い絵画 レオノーレ・フィニによせて	Tableau Noir	for speaker and chamber orchestra	words by Kuniharu Akiyama (秋山邦晴); inspired by the art of Leonor Fini
Vocal	1961	恋のかくれんぼ	The Game of Love (Koi no kakurenbo)	for voice and piano	words by Shuntarō Tanikawa
Vocal	1961	○と△の歌	A Song of ○'s (Circles) and △'s (Triangles) (Maru to sankaku no uta)	for voice and piano	words by the composer
Vocal	1962	環礁	Coral Island	for soprano and orchestra	words by Makoto Ōoka
Vocal	1962	小さな空	Small Sky (Chiisana sora)	for voice and piano	words by the composer
Vocal	1963	雪	La Neige (Yuki)	for voice and piano	French words by Shin'ichi Segi (瀬木慎一); theme song from the 1963 film White and Black (白と黒)
Vocal	1963	見えないこども	Unseen Child (Mienai kodomo)	for voice and piano	words by Shuntarō Tanikawa
Vocal	1963	雲に向かって起つ	Take Off for the Clouds (Kumo ni mukatte tatsu)		song for a television drama; words by Shuntarō Tanikawa
Vocal	1963	素晴らしい悪女	A Marvelous Kid (Subarashii akujo)	for voice and piano	Spanish words by Fumio Nagata (永田文夫); theme song from the 1978 film A Marvelous Kid
Vocal	1965	三月のうた	In the Month of March (Sangatsu no uta)	for voice and piano	words by Shuntarō Tanikawa
Vocal	1965	死んだ男の残したものは	All That the Man Left Behind When He Died (Shinda otoko no nokoshita mono wa)	for voice and piano	words by Shuntarō Tanikawa
Vocal	1966	ワルツ	Waltz	for voice and piano	German words by Tatsuji Iwabuchi (岩淵達治); from the 1966 film The Face of Another
Vocal	1968	めぐり逢い	The Encounter (Meguriai)	for voice and piano	words by Ichirō Araki (荒木一郎); theme song from the 1968 film Two Hearts in the Rain
Vocal	1978	燃える秋	Glowing Autumn (Moeru aki)	for voice and piano	words by Hiroyuki Itsuki; theme song from the 1978 film Glowing Autumn
Vocal	1978	翼	Wings (Tsubasa)	for voice and piano	words by the composer
Vocal	1979	さくら さくら	Sakura Sakura	for voice and piano	Japanese folk song
Vocal	1983	島へ	To the Island (Shima e)	for voice and piano	words by Mitsuru Izawa
Vocal	1985	明日ハ晴レカナ、曇リカナ	Will Tomorrow, I Wonder, Be Cloudy or Clear? (Ashita wa hare kana, kumori kana)	for voice and piano	words by the composer
Vocal	1985	ぽつねん	All Alone (Potsunen)	for voice and piano	words by Shuntarō Tanikawa
Vocal	1995	昨日のしみ	Yesterday's Spot (Kinō no shimi)	for voice and piano	words by Shuntarō Tanikawa
Jazz	1958	パナンペの思いがけない勝利の話－アイヌ民話よりの自由な脚色－	Panampe no omoigakenai shōri no hanashi, Based on the Ainu Folklore	for a chorus of five male singers and jazz band	
Jazz	1960	お休み！	Be Sleep Baby!		
Jazz	1961	3たす3と3ひく3	3 tasu 3 to 3 hiku 3 (3 Plus 3 and 3 Minus 3)		
Stage	1951		Joie de vivre		Ballet
Stage	1953	銀河鉄道の旅	Ginga tetsudo no tabi		Fantastic Ballet
Stage	1954		Romantic Suite: Nutcracker for Children		Children's Ballet; collaboration with Jun Date after Tchaikovsky
Stage	1954	夏と煙	Summer and Smoke		Incidental music for the play by Tennessee Williams
Stage	1955	未来のイヴ	Eve of the Future	for tape	Ballet; musical collaboration with composer Toshirō Mayuzumi
Stage	1955	野性の女	La Sauvage		Incidental music for the play by Jean Anouilh
Stage	1955	アンフィトリオン38	Amphitryon 38		Incidental music for the play by Jean Giraudoux
Stage	1956	愛の条件〈オルフェとユリディス〉	Ai no jōken (Orphée et Eurydice)		Incidental music for a version of the play Eurydice by Jean Anouilh
Stage	1956	せむしの聖女	A Hunchbacked Sacred Woman		Incidental music a reworking of the play Ardèle ou la Marguerite by Jean Anouilh
Stage	1956	Kの死	The Death of K (K no shi)		Incidental music for the play by Shuntarō Tanikawa
Stage	1956	タンタロスの踊り	Tantalos no odori		Incidental music for the play by Rinzō Shiina
Stage	1957	トロイ戦争は起こらないだろう	La guerre de Troie n'aura pas lieu		Incidental music for the play The Trojan War Will Not Take Place by Jean Giraudoux
Stage	1957	守銭奴	L'Avare		Incidental music for the play by Molière
Stage	1958	国性爺	Koxinga (Kokusen'ya)		Incidental music for the puppet play The Battles of Coxinga by Chikamatsu Monzaemon
Stage	1959	海賊	Le Corsaire		Incidental music for the play by Marcel Achard
Stage	1959	死せる女王	La Reine morte		Incidental music for the play by Henry de Montherlant
Stage	1959	怒りを込めて振り返れ	Look Back in Anger		Incidental music for the 1956 play by John Osborne
Stage	1960	狼生きろ豚は死ね	The Wolf Must Live, the Pig Must Die (Ookami ikiro buta wa shine)		Incidental music for the 1963 play by Shintarō Ishihara
Stage	1960	お芝居はおしまい	The Play Is Finished (Oshibai wa oshimai)		Incidental music for the play by Shuntarō Tanikawa
Stage	1961	おまえの敵はおまえだ	Omae no teki wa omae da		Incidental music for the play by Jun Ishikawa
Stage	1961	地獄のオルフェ	Orpheus Descending		Incidental music for the play by Tennessee Williams
Stage	1962	黒の悲劇	Black Tragedy (Kuro no higeki)		Incidental music for the play by Seiichi Yashiro (矢代静一)
Stage	1962	白夜	White Night (Byakuya): An Intermezzo		Incidental music for the play by Shūji Terayama
Stage	1964	一ノ谷物語 – 琴魂 –	Ichinotani monogatari: Kotodama		Incidental music for the play by Shintarō Ishihara
Stage	1964	一柳慧のためのブルー・オーロラ	Blue Aurora for Toshi Ichiyanagi		Theatre Piece
Stage	1964		Time Perspective for Jasper Johns		Theatre Piece
Stage	1966	七つの丘の出来事	Seven Hills Events for Ay-O		Theatre Piece
Stage	1966	カラマーゾフの兄弟	The Brothers Karamazov		Incidental music for the play by Fyodor Dostoyevsky
Stage	1972	マクベス	Macbeth		Incidental music for the play by William Shakespeare
Stage	1973	愛の眼鏡は色ガラス	Love Wears Tinted Glasses (Ai no megane wa iro garasu)		Incidental music for the 1973 play by Kōbō Abe
Stage	1974	祝典喜劇 ポセイドンの仮面際	Poseidon Mask Festival (Shukuten kigeki Poseidon kamensai)		Incidental music for the 1973 play by Kunio Tsuji
Stage	1975	シラノ・ド・ベルジュラック	Cyrano de Bergerac		Incidental music for the play by Edmond Rostand
Stage	1979	子午線の祀り	Festival of the Meridian (Shigosen no matsuri)		Incidental music for the play by Junji Kinoshita
Stage	1982	ウィングズ – 翼 –	Wings		Incidental music for the play by Arthur Kopit
Stage	1984	波長（ウェイブレングス）	Wavelength	for 2 percussion players, 2 dancers with video installation	Theatrical work; unfinished
Electronic music	1955	ルリエフ･スタティク	Static Relief	for tape	
Electronic music	1956	ヴォーカリズムA・I	Vocalism A・I	for tape	musique concrète
Electronic music	1956	木・空・鳥	Tree, Sky, Bird (ki・sora・tori)	for tape	musique concrète
Electronic music	1956	ユリディスの死	La Mort de Eurydice	for tape	
Electronic music	1958	空、馬、そして死	Sky, Horse and Death	for tape	
Electronic music	1956–1957	クラップ・ヴォーカリズム	Clap Vocalism	for tape	
Electronic music	1957		Dialogue	for tape	
Electronic music	1960	クワイエト・デザイン	Quiet Design	for tape	
Electronic music	1960	水の曲	Water Music	for tape	
Electronic music	1964	怪談	Kwaidan	for tape	
Electronic music	1964	懐かしのサンフランシスコ	Natsukashino San Francisco [Longed-for San Francisco]	for tape	
Electronic music	1970		Years of Ear – What Is Music? –	for tape	
Electronic music	1970	トゥワード	Toward	for tape	
Electronic music	1986	ミネアポリスの庭	A Minneapolis Garden	for tape	
Electronic music	1986	静寂の海	The Sea Is Still	for tape	
Commercial music	1954	森永チョコレート	Morinaga Chocolate		
Commercial music	1982	サントリーリザーブ	Suntory Reserve		
Film scores	1955	北斎	Hokusai		not produced
Film scores	1955	銀輪	Ginrin		also known as Bicycle in Dream
Film scores	1956	狂った果実	Crazed Fruit		directed by Kō Nakahira; co-composed with Masaru Satō; also known as Juvenile Passions
Film scores	1956	朱と緑	Red and Green, aka Midnight Visitor		directed by Noboru Nakamura
Film scores	1956	つゆのあとさき	The Rainy season		directed by Noboru Nakamura
Film scores	1957	土砂降り	Cloudburst (Doshaburi)		directed by Noboru Nakamura
Film scores	1958	噛みつかれた顔役	The Country Boss		directed by Noboru Nakamura
Film scores	1959	ホゼー・トレス	José Torres		directed by Hiroshi Teshigahara
Film scores	1959	春を待つ人々	Waiting for Spring		directed by Noboru Nakamura
Film scores	1959	危険旅行	Dangerous trip, aka Vagabond Lovers		directed by Noboru Nakamura
Film scores	1959	いたづら	Joking, aka Love Letters		directed by Noboru Nakamura
Film scores	1959	明日への盛装			directed by Noboru Nakamura
Film scores	1960	乾いた湖	Dry Lake, aka Youth in Fury		directed by Masahiro Shinoda
Film scores	1960	波の塔			directed by Noboru Nakamura
Film scores	1961	もず	The Shrikes		directed by Minoru Shibuya
Film scores	1961	斑女	Hannyo, aka Woman of Tokyo		directed by Noboru Nakamura
Film scores	1961	不良少年	Bad Boys		directed by Susumu Hani
Film scores	1962	熱海ブルース	Atami Blues		directed by Donald Richie
Film scores	1962	充たされた生活	Mitasareta seikatsu (A Full Life)		directed by Susumu Hani
Film scores	1962	からみ合い	The Inheritance		directed by Masaki Kobayashi
Film scores	1962	切腹	Harakiri		directed by Masaki Kobayashi
Film scores	1962	おとし穴	Pitfall		directed by Hiroshi Teshigahara
Film scores	1962	涙を、獅子のたてがみに	Tears in the Lion's Mane		directed by Masahiro Shinoda
Film scores	1962	裸体	The Body		directed by Masashige Narisawa (成澤昌茂)
Film scores	1963	イヴ・クライン モノクロームの画家	Yves Klein: Monochrome Artist		directed by Shin'ichi Segi (瀬木慎一); documentary film about Yves Klein
Film scores	1963	古都	Twin Sisters in Kyoto		directed by Noboru Nakamura
Film scores	1963	素晴らしい悪女	A Marvelous Kid, aka Wonderful Bad Woman		directed by Hideo Onchi
Film scores	1963	太平洋ひとりぼっち	Alone on the Pacific		directed by Kon Ichikawa
Film scores	1963	彼女と彼	Kanojo to kare (She and He)		directed by Susumu Hani
Film scores	1963	白と黒	White and Black		directed by Hiromichi Horikawa (堀川弘通)
Film scores	1964	砂の女	The Woman in the Dunes		directed by Hiroshi Teshigahara
Film scores	1964	乾いた花	Pale Flower		directed by Masahiro Shinoda
Film scores	1964	手をつなぐ子ら	Children Hand in Hand		directed by Susumu Hani
Film scores	1964	白い朝	The White Dawn		directed by Hiroshi Teshigahara
Film scores	1964	怪談	Kwaidan		directed by Masaki Kobayashi
Film scores	1964	二十一歳の父	Our Happiness Alone, aka 21-Year-Old Father		directed by Noboru Nakamura
Film scores	1964	暗殺	Assassination		directed by Masahiro Shinoda
Film scores	1964	日本脱出	Nippon Escape		directed by Yoshishige Yoshida
Film scores	1964	女体	The Call of Flesh		directed by Hideo Onchi
Film scores	1964	自動車泥棒	Car Thieves		directed by Yoshinori Wada (和田嘉訓)
Film scores	1965	美しさと哀しみと	With Beauty and Sadness		directed by Masahiro Shinoda; based on the novel Beauty and Sadness by Yasunari Kawabata
Film scores	1965	最後の審判	Last Judgement		directed by Hiromichi Horikawa (堀川弘通)
Film scores	1965	不思議なクミコ	Le Mystère Koumiko		directed by Chris Marker; documentary film
Film scores	1965	ブワナ・トシの歌	Bwana Toshi		directed by Susumu Hani
Film scores	1965	異聞猿飛佐助	Samurai Spy		directed by Masahiro Shinoda
Film scores	1965	四谷怪談	Yotsuya Ghost Story		directed by Shirō Toyoda
Film scores	1965	けものみち	Beast Alley		directed by Eizō Sugawa; based on the novel Beast Alley by Seichō Matsumoto
Film scores	1966	紀ノ川 花の巻 文緒の巻			directed by Noboru Nakamura; based on the novel The River Ki by Sawako Ariyoshi
Film scores	1966	処刑の島	Captive's Island		directed by Masahiro Shinoda
Film scores	1966	他人の顔	The Face of Another		directed by Hiroshi Teshigahara; film adaptation of the novel by Kōbō Abe
Film scores	1966	あこがれ	Once a Rainy Day, aka Longing		directed by Hideo Onchi
Film scores	1967	伊豆の踊子	The Dancing Girl of Izu, aka Izu Dancer		directed by Hideo Onchi; film adaptation of the novel by Yasunari Kawabata
Film scores	1967	上意討ち 拝領妻始末	Samurai Rebellion		directed by Masaki Kobayashi
Film scores	1967	あかね雲	Clouds at Sunset		directed by Masahiro Shinoda
Film scores	1967	乱れ雲	Two in the Shadow, aka Scattered Clouds		directed by Mikio Naruse
Film scores	1968	めぐりあい	Two Hearts in the Rain, aka The Encounter		directed by Hideo Onchi
Film scores	1968	燃えつきた地図	The Ruined Map, aka The Man without a Map		directed by Hiroshi Teshigahara; based on the novel The Ruined Map by Kōbō Abe
Film scores	1968	日本の青春	Hymn to a Tired Man		directed by Masaki Kobayashi
Film scores	1968	京	Kyō		directed by Kon Ichikawa; documentary film
Film scores	1969	心中天網島	Double Suicide		directed by Masahiro Shinoda
Film scores	1969	弾痕	The Bullet Wounded		directed by Shirō Moritani
Film scores	1970	東京戦争戦後秘話	He Died after the War		directed by Nagisa Oshima; also known as The Man Who Left His Will on Film
Film scores	1970	どですかでん	Dodes'ka-den		directed by Akira Kurosawa
Film scores	1970	太陽の狩人	Sun's Hunter		directed by Hideo Onchi; documentary film
Film scores	1971	甦える大地	The Earth Is Born Again		directed by Noboru Nakamura
Film scores	1971	儀式	The Ceremony		directed by Nagisa Oshima
Film scores	1971	いのちぼうにふろう	Inn of Evil		directed by Masaki Kobayashi
Film scores	1971	沈黙	Silence		directed by Masahiro Shinoda
Film scores	1971	天皇の世紀			
Film scores	1972	サマー・ソルジャー	Summer Soldiers		directed by Hiroshi Teshigahara
Film scores	1972	夏の妹	Dear Summer Sister		directed by Nagisa Oshima
Film scores	1972	Wonder World	Wonder World		documentary film
Film scores	1973	青幻記 遠い日の母は美しく	Time within Memory		directed by Toichiro Narushima (成島東一郎)
Film scores	1973	化石の森	The Petrified Forest		directed by Masahiro Shinoda
Film scores	1974	卑弥呼	Himiko		directed by Masahiro Shinoda
Film scores	1974	しあわせ	Happiness		directed by Hideo Onchi
Film scores	1974	化石	The Fossil		directed by Masaki Kobayashi; based on the novel by Yasushi Inoue
Film scores	1975	桜の森の満開の下	Under the Blossoming Cherry Trees		directed by Masahiro Shinoda
Film scores	1977	錆びた炎	Incandescent Flame		directed by Masahisa Sadanaga (貞永方久)
Film scores	1977	はなれ瞽女おりん	Ballad of Orin		directed by Masahiro Shinoda
Film scores	1978	愛の亡霊	Empire of Passion		directed by Nagisa Oshima
Film scores	1978	燃える秋	Glowing Autumn		directed by Masaki Kobayashi
Film scores	1978	ファーム・ソング – 「日本人」第三部 –	The Japanese, A Film Trilogy: Farm Song (Part III)		directed by John Nathan; documentary film
Film scores	1979	火宅 能「求塚」より			directed by Kihachirō Kawamoto; live action animation film
Film scores	1980	天平の甍	An Ocean to Cross		directed by Kei Kumai
Film scores	1980	気 Breathing	Breathing		directed by Toshio Matsumoto
Film scores	1981	水俣の図・物語	The Minamata Mural		directed by Noriaki Tsuchimoto; documentary film
Film scores	1981	蓮如とその母	Rennyo, the Priest and His Mother		directed by Kihachirō Kawamoto; live action animation film
Film scores	1981	シルクロード – 光と風と音 –	Silk Road: Hikari to kaze to oto		documentary film (soundtrack for a video disc)
Film scores	1982	予言	Prophecy		directed by Susumu Hani
Film scores	1983	東京裁判	Tokyo Trial (Tokyo Verdict)		directed by Masaki Kobayashi; documentary film
Film scores	1984	アントニー・ガウディー	Antonio Gaudí		directed by Hiroshi Teshigahara; documentary film
Film scores	1985	火まつり	Fire Festival		directed by Mitsuo Yanagimachi
Film scores	1985	乱	Ran		directed by Akira Kurosawa
Film scores	1985	AK ドキュメント黒澤明	A.K.		directed by Chris Marker; documentary film
Film scores	1985	ボクはボクに会いに行った	Boku wa boku ni aini itta		documentary film
Film scores	1985	食卓のない家	The Empty Table, aka Home without a Table		directed by Masaki Kobayashi
Film scores	1986	近松門左衛門 鑓の権三	Gonza the Spearman		directed by Masahiro Shinoda; after a play by Chikamatsu Monzaemon
Film scores	1987	ヒロシマという名の少年	A Boy Named Hiroshima		directed by Yoshiya Sugata (菅田良哉)
Film scores	1988	嵐が丘	Wuthering Heights		directed by Yoshishige Yoshida; based on the novel by Emily Brontë
Film scores	1989	黒い雨	Black Rain		directed by Shōhei Imamura
Film scores	1989	利休	Rikyu		directed by Hiroshi Teshigahara
Film scores	1991	インランド・シー	The Inland Sea		directed by Lucille Carra; documentary film
Film scores	1992	豪姫	Basara, the Princess Goh		directed by Hiroshi Teshigahara
Film scores	1992	夢窓 庭との語らい	Dream Window: Reflections on the Japanese Garden		directed by John Junkerman; documentary film
Film scores	1993	ライジング・サン	Rising Sun		directed by Philip Kaufman
Film scores	1995	写楽	Sharaku		directed by Masahiro Shinoda
Film scores	1995	日本映画の百年	100 Years of Japanese Cinema		directed by Nagisa Oshima; documentary film
Radio scores	1955	音の四季	Oto no shiki: Symphonic Poem for Concrete Sound Objects and Music		composition for radio
Radio scores	1955	海の幻想	Umi no gensō		composition for radio
Radio scores	1955	炎	Honoo		radio drama
Radio scores	1956	Kの死	K no shi		radio drama
Radio scores	1956	秋の蝶	Aki no chō		radio drama
Radio scores	1956		Ningen Kazoku: Radio Fantasy		radio drama
Radio scores	1957		Gendai no Jujiro		radio documentary
Radio scores	1957		Sonanhi		radio drama
Radio scores	1957	男の死	Otoko no shi (Billy the Kid): A Dialogic Cantata		radio drama
Radio scores	1958	顔またはドン・ファンの死	Kao, matawa Don Juan no shi: Radio Drama in Kyōgen Style		radio drama
Radio scores	1958	遠い声	Tooi koe		radio drama
Radio scores	1958		Taiyo no shogen: Radio Montage		radio drama
Radio scores	1958	心中天の網島	Shinjū ten no amijima: Radio Illusion		radio drama
Radio scores	1958		Hiroshima 1958: A Documentary Poetic Drama		radio drama
Radio scores	1958		Children's Corner		radio drama
Radio scores	1959		Onnamen		radio drama
Radio scores	1959	ポジション	Position: Collage of Voices		composition for radio
Radio scores	1959		Kyoko no ie		radio drama
Radio scores	1960		Kotoba no hiroba		educational radio program
Radio scores	1960	白い恐怖	Shiroi kyōfu: A Poem Composed for Radio		radio drama
Radio scores	1960		Hitachibo Kaison		radio drama
Radio scores	1960		Operation 1960		radio drama
Radio scores	1960		Kuro no kiroku 1960 nen: Magarikado de furikaeru		radio documentary
Radio scores	1962		Gun King		radio drama
Radio scores	1962		Kuroi nagai kage no kiroku		radio drama
Radio scores	1962	瘋癲老人日記	Futen rōjin nikki		radio drama
Radio scores	1962		Kokoro no uchū o iku		radio drama
Radio scores	1963	チャンピオン	Champion: An Architectural Attempted by Sound		radio drama
Radio scores	1977		Chikatetsu no Alice		radio drama
Radio scores	1978		Aa Mujo		radio drama
Radio scores	1980		Toyamaru wa naze shizundaka		radio drama
Radio scores	1980		Tooi anata e		radio drama
Radio scores	1981	津の国人	Tsunokunibito		radio reading of the novel by Murō Saisei
Radio scores	1983	かたちもなく寂し	Katachi mo naku sabishi		radio drama
Radio scores	1983	上海幻影路	Shanghai geneiro		radio drama
Radio scores	1988	でんしゃみち	Denshamichi		radio drama
Television scores	1955	家なき子	Ienakiko		children's television program
Television scores	1959	あざのある女	Aza no aru onna		television drama
Television scores	1960	日本一九六〇	Nippon 1960		television documentary
Television scores	1961	あなたは誰でしょう	Anata wa dare deshō		television drama
Television scores	1961	ムックリを吹く女	Mukkuri o fuku onna		television drama
Television scores	1962	日本の文様	Nippon no monyo		television documentary
Television scores	1962	廃墟	Haikyo		television documentary
Television scores	1962	祭	Matsuri		television drama
Television scores	1963	もし、あなただったら...	Moshi, anata dattara...		television drama
Television scores	1963	正塚の婆さん	Shōzuka no baasan		television drama
Television scores	1964	青春の碑	Seishun no hi		television documentary
Television scores	1964	目撃者	Mokugekisha		television drama
Television scores	1965	ある女の影	Aru onna no kage		television drama
Television scores	1965	源氏物語	Genji Monogatari (The Tale of Genji)		television drama
Television scores	1966	源義経	Minamotono Yoshitsune		television drama
Television scores	1966	二十歳	Hatachi		television drama
Television scores	1966	楠木正成	Kusunoki Masashige		television drama
Television scores	1966	足利尊氏	Ashikaga Takauji		television drama
Television scores	1966	あなたは...	Anata wa...		television documentary
Television scores	1967	剣	Ken		television drama
Television scores	1968	恩讐の彼方に	Onshu no kanata ni		television drama
Television scores	1968	元禄一代女	Genroku ichidai onna		television drama
Television scores	1969	悪一代	Aku ichidai		television drama
Television scores	1971	もう一つの傷	Mo hitotsu no kizu		television drama
Television scores	1971	天皇の世紀	Tenno no seiki		television drama
Television scores	1972	女人幻想	Nyonin genso		television drama
Television scores	1972	イン・モーション – 音と映像による音楽作品 –	In Motion: A Musical Work of Sounds and Visions		television broadcast
Television scores	1972	化石	The Fossil (Kaseki)		television drama
Television scores	1973	わが愛	Waga ai		television drama
Television scores	1974	私という他人	Watashi to iu tanin		television drama
Television scores	1974	未来への遺産	Mirai e no isan / The Legend for the Future		television documentary
Television scores	1976	冬の虹	Fuyu no niji		television drama
Television scores	1977	命もいらず名もいらず・西郷隆盛伝	Inochi mo irazu, na mo irazu: Saigō Takamori den		television drama about Saigō Takamori
Television scores	1977	危険な童話 私は殺さない...	Kiken na dōwa: Watashi wa korosanai...		television drama
Television scores	1978	おはん	Ohan		television drama
Television scores	1979	ルーヴル美術館－絢爛たる人類の遺産－	Le Musée du Louvre: Kenrantaru jinrui no isan		television documentary
Television scores	1979	赤穂浪士	Akō roshi		television drama
Television scores	1980	血族	Ketsuzoku		television drama
Television scores	1981	夢千代日記	Yumechiyo nikki		television drama
Television scores	1982	NHK市民大学	NHK Shimin Daigaku		educational television program
Television scores	1983	ジョバンニの銀河 1983	Giovanni no ginga 1983		visual poem broadcast on television
Television scores	1983	まあええわいな	Maa eewaina		television drama
Television scores	1983	話すことはない	Hanasu koto wa nai		television drama
Television scores	1983	波の盆	Nami no bon		television drama
Television scores	1984	21世紀は警告する	21 Seiki wa keikokusuru		television documentary
Television scores	1985	おさんの恋	Osan no koi		television drama
Television scores	1985	谷崎・その愛、我という人の心は	Tanizaki: Sono ai, ware to iu hito no kokoro wa		television drama
Television scores	1986	禅の世界	Zen no sekai		television documentary
Television scores	1987	今朝の秋	Kesa no aki		television drama
Television scores	1989	山頭火－何でこんなに淋しい風がふく－	Santoka, nande konnani sabishii kaze fuku		television drama
Television scores	1993	幻 源氏物語絵巻	Maboroshi: Genji monogatari emaki		television drama
