= From me flows what you call Time =

Composition by Tōru Takemitsu

- by Tōru Takemitsu
- Composed: 1990
- Duration: c. 31 minutes
- Scoring: five percussionists and orchestra

Premiere
- Date: October 19, 1990
- Location: Carnegie Hall, New York City
- Conductor: Seiji Ozawa
- Performers: Nexus and the Boston Symphony Orchestra

From me flows what you call Time is a 1990 concerto for five percussionists and orchestra by the Japanese composer Tōru Takemitsu. It is considered one of the best of Takemitsu's late works.

== Conception ==
From me flows what you call Time was commissioned by the Carnegie Hall Foundation to celebrate Carnegie Hall's centennial season, and was premiered on October 19, 1990 by Nexus and the Boston Symphony Orchestra, conducted by Seiji Ozawa. The title is taken from the poem "Clear Blue Water" by Makoto Ōoka, a Japanese poet and a friend of Takemitsu's.

== Composition ==
Takemitsu intended the work to represent the music that had "flowed" through Carnegie Hall throughout its hundred-year history. As in many of Takemitsu's works, a blend of European and Japanese traditions creates a unique idiom.

The piece includes several improvised sections, an element inspired by John Cage's indeterminacy. In the score, Takemitsu noted that "the performance should give the impression of being completely improvised."

After a brief flute solo at the piece's opening, the five solo percussionists enter the hall. Each is wearing a pocket square of a different color, each meant to represent one of the natural phenomena (blue for water, red for fire, yellow for earth, green for wind, and white for sky). These colors are meant to represent the Tibetan Buddhist principle of Wind Horse. In the same colors are long ribbons, linking the stage to bells and chimes hung from the hall's ceiling. Later in the piece, the ribbons are used by the players to ring these bells.

=== Structure ===
The piece is separated into thirteen sections:

1. Introduction
2. Entrance of the Soloists
3. A Breath of Air
4. Premonition
5. Plateau
6. Curved Horizon
7. The Wind Blows
8. Premonition
9. Mirage
10. Waving Wind Horse
11. The Promised Land
12. Life's Joys and Sorrows
13. A Prayer

=== Instrumentation ===
The piece is scored for the following orchestra:

Percussion soloists

Percussion I:

Glockenspiel
Vibraphone
Steel drum
2 Crotales

Percussion II:

7 Pakistani Noah bells
5 Thai gongs
Crotalphone
2 Japanese temple bowls on pedal timpani
6 Chinese winter gongs
2 Crotales
Angklung
Darabukka
Wind chimes

Percussion III:

2 Crotales
5 Almglockens
Set of boobam (or log drums)
5 Tom-toms
Angklung
2 Snare drums
Wind Chimes

Percussion IV:

2 Crotales
Glockenspiel
Marimba
3 Tam-tams
3 Suspended cymbals
3 Chinese cymbals
Angklung
Bells

Percussion V:

2 Crotales
Glockenspiel
Marimba
Angklung
2 Japanese temple bowls on pedal timpani

Woodwinds
3 Flutes (2nd and 3rd doubling piccolo, 3rd doubling alto flute)
3 Oboes (2nd doubling Oboe d'amore, 3rd doubling English Horn)
4 Clarinets (2nd doubling E♭ clarinet, 3rd doubling bass clarinet, 4th doubling contrabass clarinet)
3 Bassoons (3rd doubling contrabassoon)

Brass
4 Horns
3 Trumpets
3 Trombones

Keyboard
Celesta

Strings
2 Harps

14 Violin I
12 Violin II
10 Violas
8 Cellos
6 Double basses
