= Nexus (ensemble) =

Toronto-based percussion ensemble

- Origin: Toronto
- Genres: Contemporary classical music
- Members: Garry Kvistad, Bob Becker, Bill Cahn, Russell Hartenberger
- Past members: Michael Craden, John Wyre, Robin Engleman

Nexus is a Toronto-based percussion ensemble that performs standard percussion ensemble repertoire, ragtime music, world music, contemporary classical music and as a group, has performed as soloist with some of the top orchestras around the world.

The ensemble was originally made up of percussionists Bob Becker, Bill Cahn, Robin Engelman, Russell Hartenberger, John Wyre and Michael Craden. Founding member Michael Craden died of liver cancer in 1982. John Wyre died in 2006 and was replaced by long-time professional colleague Garry Kvistad. Robin Engelman resigned from the group in December 2009 due to vision difficulties and died on February 26, 2016.

The group formed in 1971 and debuted with a concert of entirely improvised music at the Eastman School of Music. Although the first performance only featured four of the musicians, all six performed together as Nexus shortly after in Walter Hall at the University of Toronto. In the mid-1970s the group recorded two albums with New Age music pioneer Paul Horn: Paul Horn and Nexus (1975) and Altura Do Sol (1976).

Nexus played on the soundtrack of the 1974 film The Man Who Skied Down Everest, and appeared in the 1975 National Film Board movie Musicanada.

In 1982 the group released Nexus and Earle Birney, a triple-album collaboration with noted Canadian poet Earle Birney.

The group recorded an album for the Canadian Broadcasting Corporation, Dance of the Octopus, in 1990 with harpist Judy Loman.

In 1990, Japanese composer Toru Takemitsu wrote a concerto for percussion ensemble and orchestra entitled From me flows what you call Time for the group. Takemitsu was commissioned to compose this piece for Nexus and the Boston Symphony, commemorating the 100th anniversary of Carnegie Hall. Dozens of other composers have written music specifically for Nexus and for individual members of Nexus, and the group's members are also composers and arrangers, writing for Nexus and, on occasion, for others.

In addition to their regular concerts, the group also gives masterclasses and educational performances.

Russell Hartenberger is a professor emeritus at the University of Toronto's Faculty of Music (Dean, Chair of Graduate Education, and Professor, Percussion). Robin Engelman was also a long-time staff member at the University of Toronto, where he mainly taught and conducted the percussion ensemble and the contemporary music ensemble.

== Discography ==
Year	Title	Label	Notes
1975	Paul Horn and Nexus	Epic/CBS	
1976	Altura Do Sol	Epic/CBS	Later reissued as The Altitude Of The Sun (Black Sun, 1989)
1976	Nexus Ragtime Concert	Umbrella	Later reissued (Nexus, 1991)
1978	Music of Nexus	Nexus	
1981	Under the Umbrella	CP	
1982	Changes	Nexus	
1982	Nexus & Earle Birney		
1989	The Best of Nexus	Nexus/Denon	
1990	Nexus Now	Nexus	(June 1989)
1990	Dance of the Octopus	CBC	With Judy Loman
1991	Nexus Plays the Novelty Music of G.H.Green	Nexus	
1992	Origins	Nexus	(August 1991)
1992	The Story of Percussion in the Orchestra	Nexus	(June 1992)
1994	Voices	Nexus	(January 1994)
1994	The Mother of the Book	IRJ	With Gil Evans
1995	Music for Heaven and Earth	CBC	
1995	World Diary	Papa Bear	With Tony Levin
1996	Farewell to Philosophy	POINT Music//Philips/PolyGram	(May 1995)
1997	Toccata	Nexus	(May 1996)
1997	Nexus meets Peter Sadlo	Koch	
1997	Rune	Nexus	
1997	World Drum Festival	Syrinx	(March 1997)
1998	Orchestral Music of Takemitsu	Sony Classical/SME	(February 1997)
2000	Garden of Sounds	BIS	With Richard Stoltzman (January 1999)
2001	Lullaby	Nexus	With Leigh Howard Stevens
2003	DrumTalker	Nexus	(April 2003)
2004	Rituals		Containing Concert for Violin and Orchestra (October 1998) and Rituals (March 2004) for five percussionists and orchestra.
2005	Out of the Blue		(March 2005)
2005	Wings		(June 2005)
2015	Persian Songs		(August 2015)
2021	Steve Reich	Nexus	with Sō Percussion (June 2021)

== Solo albums ==
- John Wyre: Vagabond Dream (Heron, 1991)
- Bob Becker: There is a Time (Nexus, 1994)
- William Cahn: Solo Percussionist Music (Nexus, 1996)
