= Bob Becker (composer) =

American percussionist and composer (born 1947)

- Born: June 22, 1947 (age 79); Allentown, Pennsylvania, U.S.
- Genres: Contemporary classical, Minimalism, World music
- Occupations: Percussionist, Composer
- Instruments: Marimba, Snare drum, Tabla, Keyboard percussion
- Years active: 1970s–present

Bob Becker (born June 22, 1947) is an American percussionist and composer known primarily as a founding member of the Nexus percussion ensemble, as well as a performer in the Steve Reich and Musicians ensemble. He primarily performs as a keyboard percussionist, but is also skilled in tabla and concert snare drumming. As a composer, Becker employs a multicultural approach by mixing the style of western military drumming with North Indian Hindustani idioms, such as raga scale patterns and tabla drumming. This fusion of compositional practices is the main focus of works like Lahara and Mudra. There are also traces of influence from the music of minimalists like Steve Reich, which can be attributed to Becker's experience with that composer's music.

== Life ==
=== Biography and education ===
Becker was born and raised in Allentown, Pennsylvania, where he was a student of percussionist James Betz. Betz initially taught Becker marimba, but soon expanded to lessons in snare drum, piano and music theory. After high school, Becker left Allentown to enroll in the Eastman School of Music, where he studied percussion performance with William Street and John Beck, and composition with Warren Benson and Aldo Provenzano. Becker holds a Bachelor of Music degree with Distinction and a Master of Music in Performance and Literature degree from Eastman.

Upon completing his undergraduate and graduate studies, Becker enrolled in a four-year world music program at Wesleyan University in Connecticut, where he studied with world percussionists Prawotosaputo, Sumarsam, and Freeman Donkor, as well as tabla instructor Sharda Sahai and African drum instructor Abraham Adzenyah.

=== Musical interests as a performer ===
In high school, Becker showed an interest in jazz drumming, which he had pursued in college as a performer of bebop. As a contemporary of drummers like Steve Gadd, Becker eventually changed his focus toward marimba and orchestral percussion. As an orchestral percussionist and timpanist, Becker has performed with several groups, including the Marlboro Festival Orchestra, Kirov Ballet, and Tafelmusik Baroque Orchestra.

In the 1970s, during the Marlboro Music Festival, Becker met with members of the nascent Nexus percussion ensemble, showing a shift of interest from orchestral performance toward ensemble and chamber music performance. Nexus has toured throughout North America, Asia and Europe, and has performed with groups such as the New York Philharmonic, the Chicago Symphony, and the San Francisco Symphony. Becker has also performed with the ensemble Steve Reich and Musicians and the Paul Winter Consort. Becker currently remains as an ensemble performer with Nexus.

=== Nexus and percussion literature ===
As a percussion ensemble, Nexus is one of the leading performance groups in new music. According to Becker, the group initially focused on works that featured improvisation. Repertoire soon expanded to works of more established composers, like Steve Reich and John Cage, who are attributed to forming the foundation of a post-modernist percussion repertoire. Reich's work in particular is effective for this ensemble because of Becker's involvement with a vast majority of Reich's percussion works as a member of his ensemble.

Another major element in the repertoire of Nexus is world music, which was introduced to the group through the experience of both Bob Becker and Russell Hartenberger in the world music program at Wesleyan University. Members of the ensemble, including Becker, also contribute to the repertoire through their own compositions, which "are now important standards in the percussion literature repertoire."

In terms of instrumentation, the ensemble selects works that are practical to perform on tour. Works by Cage are better suited to this need because the request for ambiguous timbres ("something that rattles," for example) means that the ensemble can work with a variety of options based on what they bring for other works. Another composition in their repertoire that works well on tour is Reich's Music for Pieces of Wood, which works well because of the portability of the instrumentation but also fits with the ensemble's repertoire of percussion standards. Other compositions in the ensemble's repertory often feature the strengths of the individual members, including two (Becker and Hartenberger) who are very proficient mallet players and the entire ensemble in terms of world percussion.

== Compositional output ==
=== Style and influences of Becker as a composer ===
As a composer, Becker is influenced by his world music education at Wesleyan, more specifically from his understanding of North Indian Classical, or Hindustani, music. The Hindustani style of composition is based primarily on raga scales as the method of pitch organization. The style focuses on communicating certain rasas, or moods, while allowing the performer to freely interpret those rasas through their own virtuosity. In terms of form, the Hindustani style tends to focus on a development "from static to ecstatic," featuring a drone followed by virtuosic, highly rhythmic content that fluctuates freely from metered to unmetered moments. There is also a tendency to initiate a composition in a slow tempo, and end it in a fast tempo.

The role of tabla drumming, something that Becker features either literally or through snare drumming, has many facets, but is in place primarily as a time keeper. The role then transforms into something more like a dialogue between the tabla and the main melodic component. Becker uses this phase to introduce his "'melodic' snare drumming," and military-based rudimental drumming, revealing a multicultural aesthetic in his music.

=== Lahara ===
One of Becker's first compositions, Lahara is a prime example of Becker's multicultural style. Written for solo drum with melodic and drone accompaniment, this work employs the previously noted blend of Hindustani practice with rudimental drumming idioms. The solo drummer provides the tabla, yet retains its identity as a solo snare drummer who features his ability to perform standard American rudiments in context of a performance. This creates a contrast of "the metrical rhythms of traditional military music" against "the apparently ametrical rhythms of [Hindustani] music." Lasting approximately 30 minutes, the work also points to Becker's experience with the minimalist works of Reich, which also share in a sense of multicultural influence. (See the Welch article in Further Reading for more details.) Percussion journalist Geary Larrick also notes the influence of Bob Becker as a performer in the work, noting the indications for sticking patterns are "quite realistic and practical."

=== Mudra ===
A major work for percussion quintet, Mudra is another example of how Becker fuses military drumming style within the context of Hindustani practices. He employs both the tactics and melodic constructions that come from North Indian Classical music. Within this frame, Becker uses western drums in a tabla-like fashion, but employs rudimental ideas. The concept of building out of stasis in Hindustani music is used to establish a motif which builds on itself and sets up the sometimes chaotic presence of the snare drum, which focuses more on the melodic and soloistic functions of tabla drumming. While not as long as Lahara, Mudra also shows inklings of minimalism that is part of Becker's overall style. This work is a reorchestrated version of a larger work called Urbhana Mudra, which was written as a percussion quartet with choreography.

=== Away Without Leave ===
In Away Without Leave, Becker draws upon traditional rudimental snare drumming that features both military and samba rhythms. This is a work that does not feature the Hindustani style, showing an expansion of Becker's multicultural influence to Latin America. This work also shows a connection to jazz drummer and colleague Steve Gadd, as this work is influenced by Gadd's composition Duke's Lullaby.

== List of works ==
- Lahara (1977), for solo drum with melodic and drone accompaniment.
- Palta (1982), for tabla or drum set, with six percussion, piano and bass.
- Urbhana Mudra (1990), for four percussion (with choreography.)
- Mudra (1990), for five percussion.
- Prisoners of the Image Factory (1992), for vibraphone, marimba and piano.
- Noodrem (1992), for four percussion and piano.
- Turning Point (1993), for four percussion and piano.
- There is a Time (1994), for vibraphone, marimba and piano (with choreography.)
- Cryin' Time (1994), for soprano, vibraphone, marimba and piano.
- Music on the Moon (1996), for full or chamber orchestra.
- New-thaan (1998), for solo drum with melodic and drone accompaniment.
- Never in Word (1998), for soprano, crotales or glockenspiel, vibraphone, marimba and piano.
- Unseen Child (2002), for five percussion.
- Away Without Leave (2002), for five percussion.
- Time in the Rock (2004), for narrator, two sopranos, two altos, string quartet, piano, vibraphone and marimba.
- Eight Etudes (2008), for solo snare drum.
- Preludes (2010), for string quartet, piano, glockenspiel, vibraphone, marimba and timpani.
