= Valeria (Takemitsu) =

Chamber music composition by Toru Takemitsu

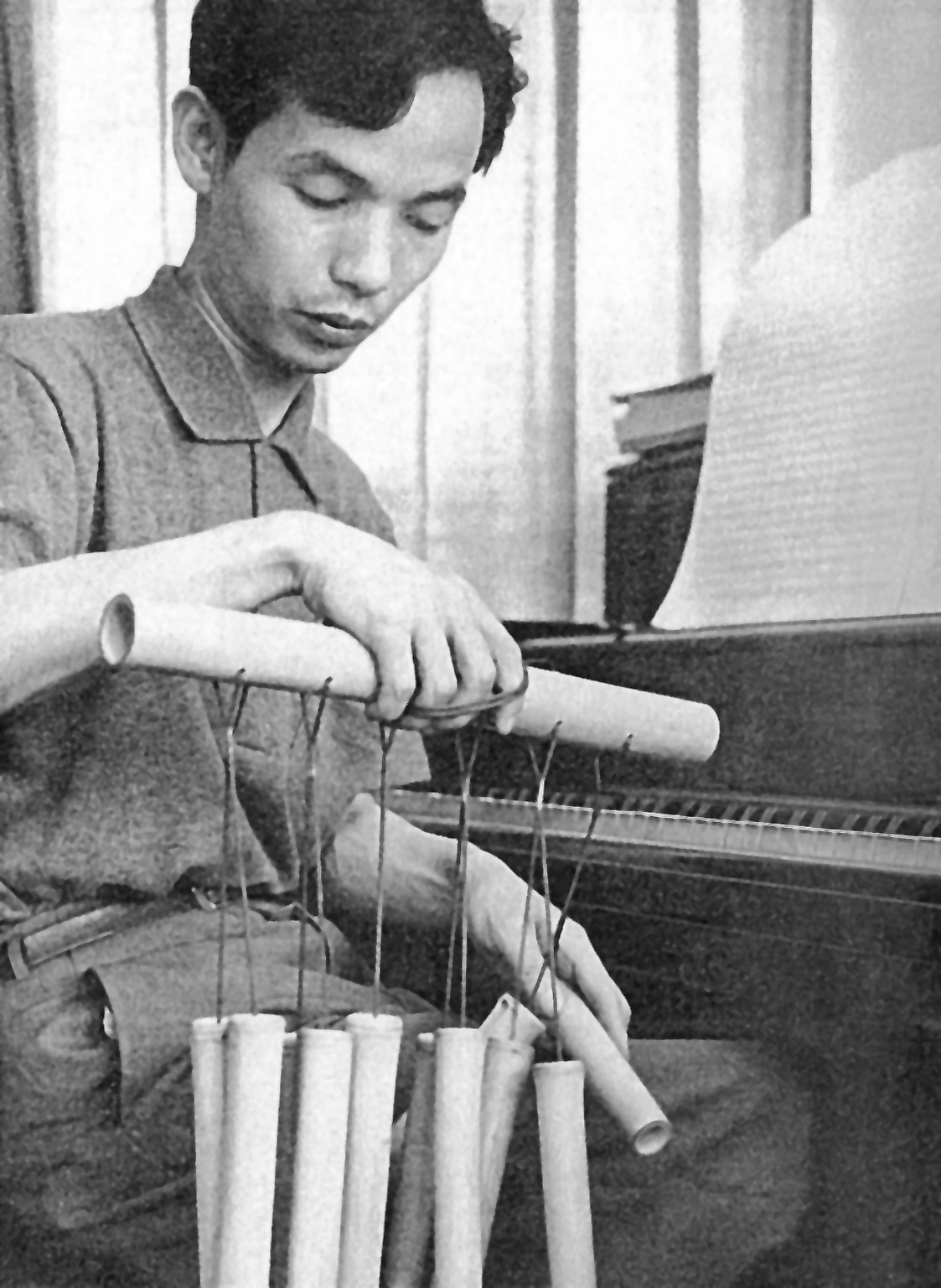
Toru Takemitsu, 1961

Valeria (Japanese: ヴァレリア) is a 1965 chamber music composition by Toru Takemitsu, recomposed from an earlier work, Sonant. Takemitsu wrote the piece for the 6th Modern Music Festival in Tokyo in 1965 for an ensemble comprising violin, cello, guitar, two bandoneons and two flutes. Four years later, he adjusted its scoring, replacing the bandoneons with an electric organ and the flutes with piccolos, and applying the title Valeria.

Hiroshi Wakasugi conducted the premiere in September 1969, and a recording at Polydor Studio 2 in Tokyo was produced at the end of that month.

== Form ==
The work is in four sections and lasts about six minutes. Section I begins with banter and pauses for the three string instruments, the guitar used somewhat percussively. Near the end they are briefly joined by the two piccolos. This is the longest section, at nearly two minutes. In Section II, named "Recitative I", morbid measures for the electric organ are soon lightened by the guitar but then copied in the violin. The cello has the forlorn last word. Section III finds the string instruments and the organ in agitated opposition to each other, creating a tense sound-space. The piccolos join in, obbligati. Unity is upheld when "Recitative II" (Section IV) returns to the ideas of its earlier self with roles and material reversed.
