= John Wyre =

U.S.-born Canadian percussionist, composer and music educator

John Harvey Wyre (17 May 1941 – 31 October 2006) was a U.S.-born Canadian percussionist, composer, and music educator. He worked as percussionist with a number of important orchestras in North America, notably serving for many years as the principal timpanist of the Toronto Symphony Orchestra. He was a founding member of the percussion ensemble Nexus, with which he performed for over 30 years. He was also artistic director of World Drums with whom he organized and directed performances at several major international events. His music compositions have been performed by ensembles throughout the world, including the New York Philharmonic, the Cleveland Orchestra, the CBC Radio Orchestra, and the Japan Philharmonic among others.

== Biography ==
Born in Philadelphia, Pennsylvania, Wyre began studying the percussion at age 15 with Fred Hinger, a percussionist with the Philadelphia Orchestra. He remained Hinger's student until 1959 when he entered the Eastman School of Music at the University of Rochester. He studied under William Street at Eastman, earning a Bachelor of Music there in 1964.

Wyre began his performance career as a percussionist with the Oklahoma City Symphony Orchestra in 1964-1965 and the Milwaukee Symphony Orchestra in 1965–1966. He then immigrated to Canada to become a timpanist with the Toronto Symphony Orchestra, serving in that capacity from 1966 to 1971 and again from 1975 to 1981. In 1971 he co-founded the percussion ensemble Nexus with whom he remained active until 2002. He also performed frequently at the New Music Concerts beginning in 1972. He became a naturalized Canadian citizen in 1972.

From 1985 to 1988, Wyre was the principal timpanist for the orchestra of the Canadian Opera Company. He was appointed to that same post with the Boston Symphony Orchestra in 1987, with whom he remained active up into 21st century. For many years he was artistic director of World Drums, with whom he notably organized a performance at Expo 86 in Vancouver; a performance which was filmed under the direction of Niv Fichman and released by Rhombus Media on VHS. In 1989 he was principal percussionist for the Scotia Festival in Halifax. He also organized World Drum performances at the Toronto International Festival (1984), the 1988 Winter Olympics, and Expo 88 among other events.

As a teacher, Wyre worked as an instructor for the National Youth Orchestra of Canada from 1967 to 1969 and served on the music faculty of the University of Toronto from 1971 to 1974. He died in St. John's, Newfoundland and Labrador at the age of 65.
