= Eta Cohen =

English violinist

- Born: Eta Cohen; 1916; Sunderland, United Kingdom
- Died: December 2012 (aged 96); Leeds, United Kingdom
- Occupations: Violin tutor, author, violinist
- Known for: Music education, The Eta Cohen Violin Method
- Spouse: Ephraim Smith (m. 1945–1989)
- Children: Maureen (born 1946), Hazel (born 1950)

Eta Cohen (1916 – 20 November 2012) was a professional English author, teacher and violinist.

Cohen was born in Sunderland, to Jewish immigrants from Lithuania. She left school at age 16 and began to teach music in local private schools in Sunderland and Newcastle. At the age of 17 she was asked to teach for the local education authority, leading her to look for a published violin method on which to base her teaching. In 1933 after failing to find a satisfactory book she decided to begin writing out the lessons she taught to her students. These lessons would eventually become the foundation of her own violin method which was published as a series of books .

In 1945, she married Ephraim Smith, a businessman in the cloth industry, whose parents were also Jewish immigrants from Lithuania. Cohen had two daughters, Maureen and Hazel, born in Leeds. She studied the violin with Max Rostal and Carl Flesch . She died at the age of 96, survived by her daughters, two granddaughters and a great-granddaughter.

== Career as an author ==
Cohen's first book, Miss Cohen's tutorial for beginners, was published by Paxtons in 1940, and a second, The Eta Cohen Violin Method, in 1941. One of the world's best-selling series of instrument tutor books, the sixth edition of The Eta Cohen Violin Method was published in 2012 by Novello & Co. It was therefore in print continuously for 71 years during the author's lifetime - this may be a world record.

Her method was based around the idea of teaching the violin incrementally, covering one new idea at a time. Breaking down difficult technical tasks and reconstructing them in easy stages continues to be a hallmark of the method book series.`James Murphy, is quoted as describing her as "the Delia Smith of violin methods", such is the comprehensive yet accessible nature of her teaching methods.

During her 70-year educational career she lectured in Australia, United States and Europe and published articles about string teaching and playing in leading journals.

As a performing violinist, she was a prominent member of the Leeds musical community. Her pupils frequently gave concerts and a large number of them have enjoyed successful musical careers. Her list of notable students includes London Sinfonietta manager Michael Vyner, James Murphy, director of the Southbank Sinfonia, violinist and El Sistema adviser Marshall Marcus, Munich Philharmonic concertmaster Julian Shevlin, Hallé concertmaster Lyn Fletcher, Principal Viola of the Philharmonia Orchestra Vicci Wardman, and composer Philip Wilby.
