= Eclipse (Takemitsu) =

1966 composition by Tōru Takemitsu

- by Tōru Takemitsu
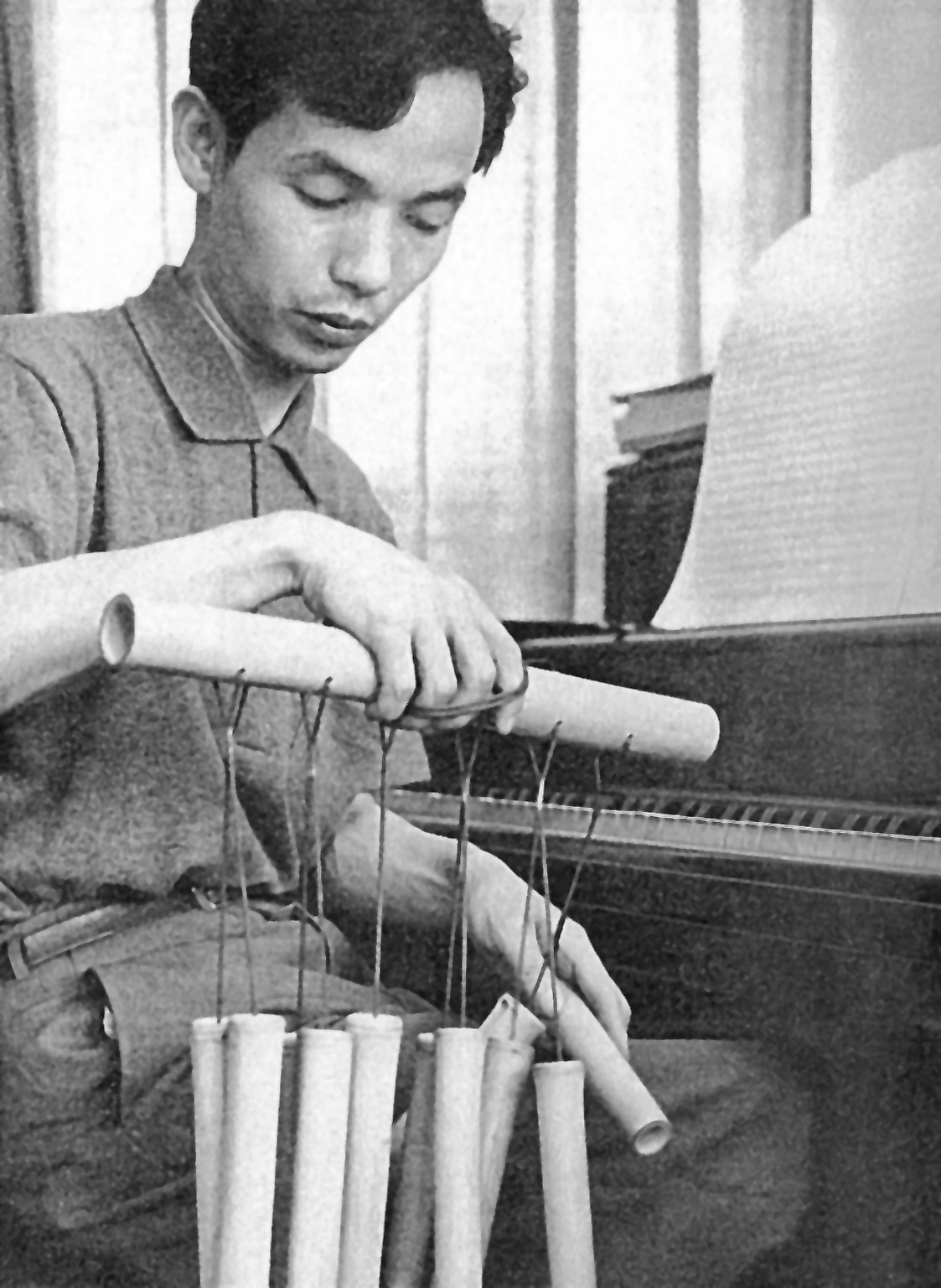
- Toru Takemitsu, 1961
- Catalogue: W43 (Siddons)
- Composed: 1966
- Performed: 4 May 1966: Tokyo
- Scoring: Biwa and shakuhachi

Eclipse (Japanese: エクリプス) is a composition for shakuhachi and biwa by Japanese composer Tōru Takemitsu. It was composed in 1966.

== Composition ==
Before Takemitsu started to compose Eclipse, he was reticent to use Japanese traditional instruments, because, as he puts it, their sound "always recalled the bitter memories of war". He started to use these instruments in 1962 Masaki Kobayashi's Harakiri. Since this first collaboration, Takemitsu started using these instruments more often, as seen in Shinoda's Assassination and Masaki Kobayashi's Kwaidan. He finally composed Eclipse in 1966 and premiered it that same year with Kinshi Tsuruta at the biwa and Katsuya Yokoyama at the shakuhachi. The premiere took place in the Nissay Theatre in Tokyo, on May 4, 1966. It is published by Éditions Salabert and has received a catalogue number W43 by James Siddons.

When Seiji Ozawa played Leonard Bernstein a tape of Eclipse, Bernstein suggested combining the instruments in a composition with the western orchestra. From this recommendation, Takemitsu eventually composed November Steps, to which this composition is strongly associated. This composition was originally performed by the same biwa and shakuhachi performers and, therefore, Eclipse is regarded as a forerunner to November Steps.

== Structure ==
This composition is in only one movement. According to the score, it takes 21 to 22 minutes to perform. However, some performances take only around 11 minutes. Eclipse is structured into several musical episodes. In between there are long silences in which the poetry of Rabindranath Tagore may be recited. In the score of this composition, the notation system is slightly different and has special symbols to cover the different possibilities of the two instruments, for they are normally used only in traditional musical context and had been rarely used in concert pieces before. The score of the biwa consists of a special tablature system which is enhanced with pitch alterations, attack qualities and the like, whereas the shakuhachi player has to read lines and shapes on a time axis. Therefore, some expressive freedom is given to the performers.

== Recordings ==
- The two performers on the premiere, Kinshi Tsuruta and Katsuya Yokoyama, have recorded the composition at least three times: studio version was recorded in August 1966 and released the same year by Victor, then in September 1975, which was released by Deutsche Grammophon, and again, in August 1990, which was released by Decca Records.
