= Michael Vyner =

English arts administrator (1943–1989)

- Vyner by Boleslaw Lutosławski
- Born: 1943; Leeds, England, UK
- Died: 20 October 1989 (aged 46); London, England, UK
- Occupation: Arts administrator
- Organization(s): London Sinfonietta; Leeds Festival
- Known for: Advocacy of contemporary classical music

Michael Vyner (1943 – 20 October 1989) was an English arts administrator. As music director of the London Sinfonietta (1972–1989) and briefly artistic director of the Leeds Festival (1987–1989), Vyner specialized in contemporary classical music. He died from an AIDS-related cancer.

== Life and career ==
Michael Vyner was born in Leeds, England, UK in 1943 to parents of Russian-Polish ancestry. He began music instruction early, studying violin from age 5 with Eta Cohen. After attending the local Roundhay High School, Vyner studied law at Leeds University and graduated in 1966.

After an early stint at the music publisher Schott Music, Vyner became the music director of the London Sinfonietta in 1972, a post he would hold until his death. At the Sinfonietta, he continued the ensemble's advocacy of contemporary classical music and commissioned numerous composers, including Witold Lutosławski, who wrote Chain I (1983) for the group. Vyner also "did much to promote [Henryk] Górecki's music in the West." In April 1987, he became artistic director of the Leeds Festival until his death.

== Personal life and death ==
Vyner was life-long bachelor; his mother described him as having lived for music. During the AIDS epidemic, he died from AIDS-related complications on 20 October 1989 in London, England, UK; an obituary lists cancer as the cause of his death.

Vyner's death occasioned a range of musical tributes from some of the major composers of the day, including Hans Werner Henze's nine-part Requiem. Other tributes included "Leaf from 6 Encores for piano by Luciano Berio; Ritual Fragment for chamber ensemble by Harrison Birtwistle; both Litany - In Memory of Michael Vyner and My Way of Life - In Memory of Michael Vyner by Toru Takemitsu; Threnody on a Plainsong for Michael Vyner for chamber ensemble by Peter Maxwell Davies; Good Night, In Memoriam Michael Vyner for chamber ensemble by Henryk Górecki; and Secret Psalm for solo violin by Oliver Knussen.

A London Sinfonietta memorial concert for Vyner took place 6 May 1990 at Covent Garden, featuring Henze's Requiem (selections) and Lutosławski's Chain I, among other works. A number of conductors participated, including David Atherton, Bernard Haitink, Knussen, Lutosławski, Simon Rattle and Esa-Pekka Salonen.

Upon his death, the Michael Vyner Trust was established as a bursary to assist young composers and commission new works; Henze donated a large sum. It was active from 1990 until 2004. Michael Vyner's papers are held by the British Library.
