= November Steps =

Composition by Toru Takemitsu

- Concerto by Tōru Takemitsu
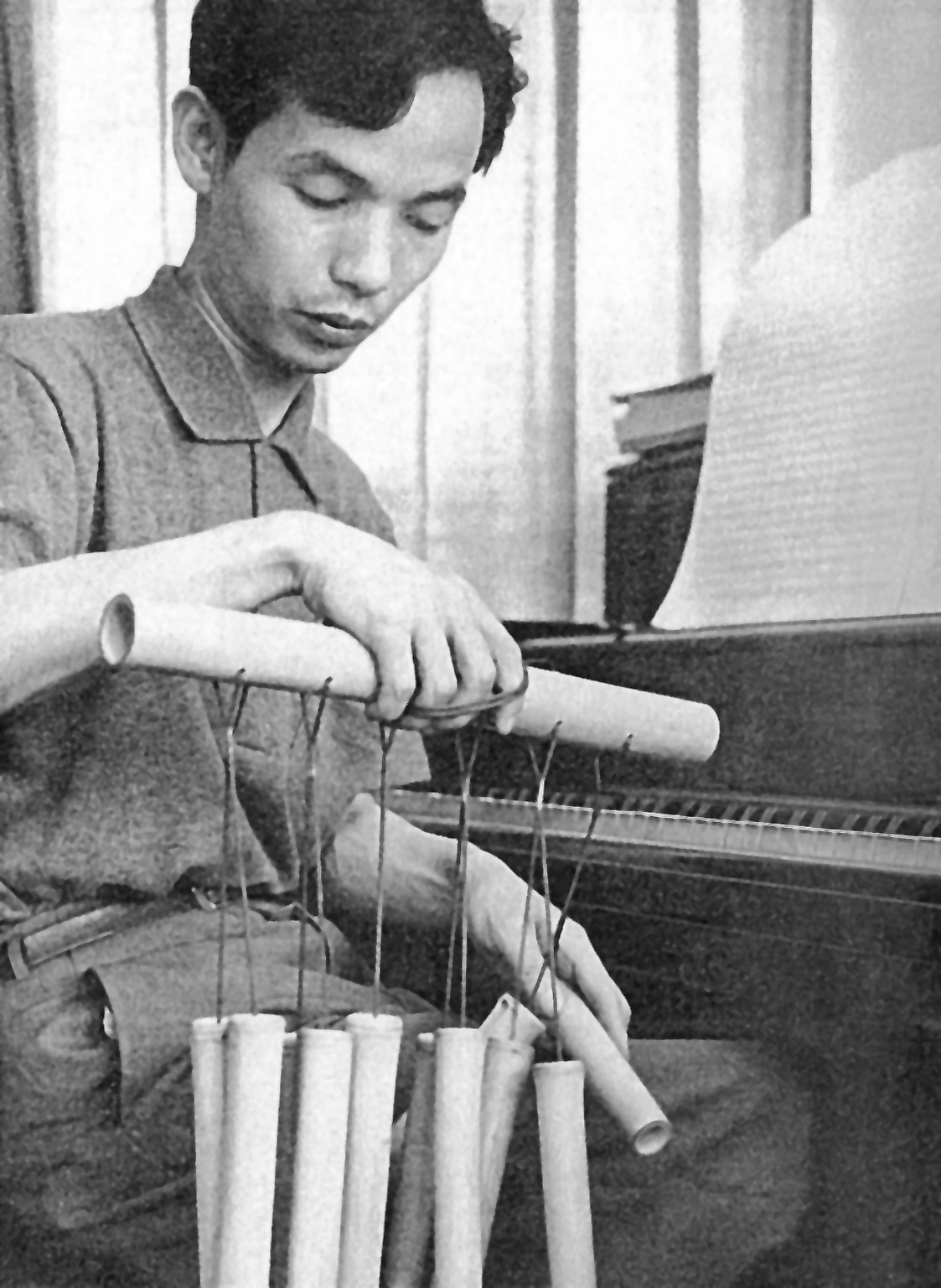
- Toru Takemitsu, 1961
- Occasion: 125th anniversary of the New York Philharmonic
- Performed: November 1967: New York City
- Scoring: shakuhachi; biwa; orchestra

November Steps (ノヴェンバー・ステップス, Novenbā Suteppusu) is a musical composition by Tōru Takemitsu, for the traditional Japanese musical instruments, shakuhachi and biwa, and western orchestra. The work was commissioned by the New York Philharmonic on the occasion of its 125th anniversary, and premiered in November 1967 by the orchestra under the direction of Seiji Ozawa.

== Background ==
In his early career, Takemitsu had been reluctant to make use of traditional Japanese music in his compositions, as he said this music "always recalled the bitter memories of war". He began experimenting with traditional Japanese instruments in the early 1960s, using them in the soundtrack to Masaki Kobayashi's 1962 film, Harakiri. Other film soundtracks in which Takemitsu used traditional instruments include Shinoda's Assassination and Masaki Kobayashi's Kwaidan (both 1964). Takemitsu's first concert composition for traditional Japanese musical instruments was Eclipse (1966) for the biwa performer, Kinshi Tsuruta, and the shakuhachi player, Katsuya Yokoyama. When Seiji Ozawa played Leonard Bernstein a tape of Eclipse, Bernstein suggested combining the instruments in a composition with the western orchestra.

Of the title to November Steps, Takemitsu offered two explanations. Taking a literal view of the title, he wrote, "It was performed in November, and to me that project represented a new step: thus, I titled the work November Steps." He further explained, "In Japanese music, danmono are the equivalent of western variations, and the word dan means step. My 'November Steps' are a set of eleven variations."

== Composition ==
During the composition of November Steps, Takemitsu secluded himself to a mountain villa, taking with him the scores to Debussy's Prelude to the Afternoon of a Faun (1894) and Jeux (1912). At first intending to unite the Japanese and the western musical instruments in the composition, he came to the decision early on that the differences between the two musical traditions were too vast to overcome. On the brink of abandoning the project, he instead decided to make the difference between the two traditions a theme of the work. Takemitsu later wrote, "It might well be that as a composition it would fail, but I completed the work in order to show as great a difference between the two traditions without blending them."

Following this line of thought, Takemitsu stated that he did not attempt to integrate the Japanese and western sounds but to display them in juxtaposition to one another, thereby emphasizing their differences. Nevertheless, the work does present correspondences between the two sounds. The plucking of the biwa with the plectrum is echoed in the orchestra by percussive effects on the strings. The shakuhachi's breath effects are echoed by clusters and glissandi in the strings. In this way, Takemitsu creates a harmony between the two instrumental bodies while maintaining their unique sound characteristics.

Takemitsu reported that the natural sounds, such as birds and wind, at first disturbed his concentration. When he began listening to them more carefully, he came to view these sounds as not different from his own music. Later, when listening to November Steps while working in Africa, the cultural anthropologist Junzo Kawada commented that the sounds of nature did not interfere with the enjoyment of Takemitsu's composition.

== Reception ==
The performers of the New York Philharmonic were openly skeptical of playing with the two Japanese instruments, however, after hearing the first extended passage for the biwa and shakuhachi, concerns began to wane. Shouts of "Bravo!" came from the orchestra after the end of the first rehearsal. The first performance received compliments from Leonard Bernstein, Krzysztof Penderecki, Aaron Copland and other prominent musicians. Takemitsu expressed the view that the positive reception of the work was proof that if a sound has value it will appeal to all people, not just to particular nationalities.

Shortly after the premier, the Toronto Symphony Orchestra, under its conductor Seiji Ozawa, gave November Steps its second performance in Toronto's Massey Hall. The work was distributed widely in the West when Ozawa and the Toronto Symphony included it on the fourth side of an LP of Messiaen's Turangalîla Symphony recorded in December 1967. Under Ozawa, this orchestra also gave the work its first televised performance, in a 1970 Canadian Broadcasting Corporation program, "East-West Concerto". In 1970, November Steps also had the distinction of being the only Japanese-composed music performed at Expo '70 when Ozawa conducted it in Suita, Osaka, Japan

== Legacy ==
The process of writing November Steps, and its success, resulted in a new direction for Takemitsu's music. Takemitsu wrote that the effort in writing the piece, "somehow liberated music from a certain stagnation and brought to music something distinctly new and different". One of the ways in which the work changed Takemitsu's music was in a less traditional approach to musical form, which was replaced with a "stream of sound". Green (1967), composed for orchestra at the same time as November Steps, is more conventional, shows the influence of the two Debussy scores in a more direct way than does November Steps. In contrast, November Steps does not adhere to traditional western concepts of musical form, but takes the view that each sound is the focus of attention.

== Sources ==
- Burt, Peter (2001). The Music of Toru Takemitsu. Cambridge University Press. ISBN 0-521-78220-1.
- Narazaki, Yoko; Kanazawa, Masakata (3 July 2008). "Takemitsu, Tōru". Grove Music Online. Oxford Music Online.
- Ohtake, Noriko (1993). Creative Sources for the Music of Toru Takemitsu. Scolar Press. ISBN 0-85967-954-3.
- Takemitsu, Tōru (1989). "Sound of East, Sound of West". Confronting Silence. Fallen Leaf Press. ISBN 0-914913-36-0.
