= Voice (Takemitsu) =

Composition by Tōru Takemitsu

- by Tōru Takemitsu
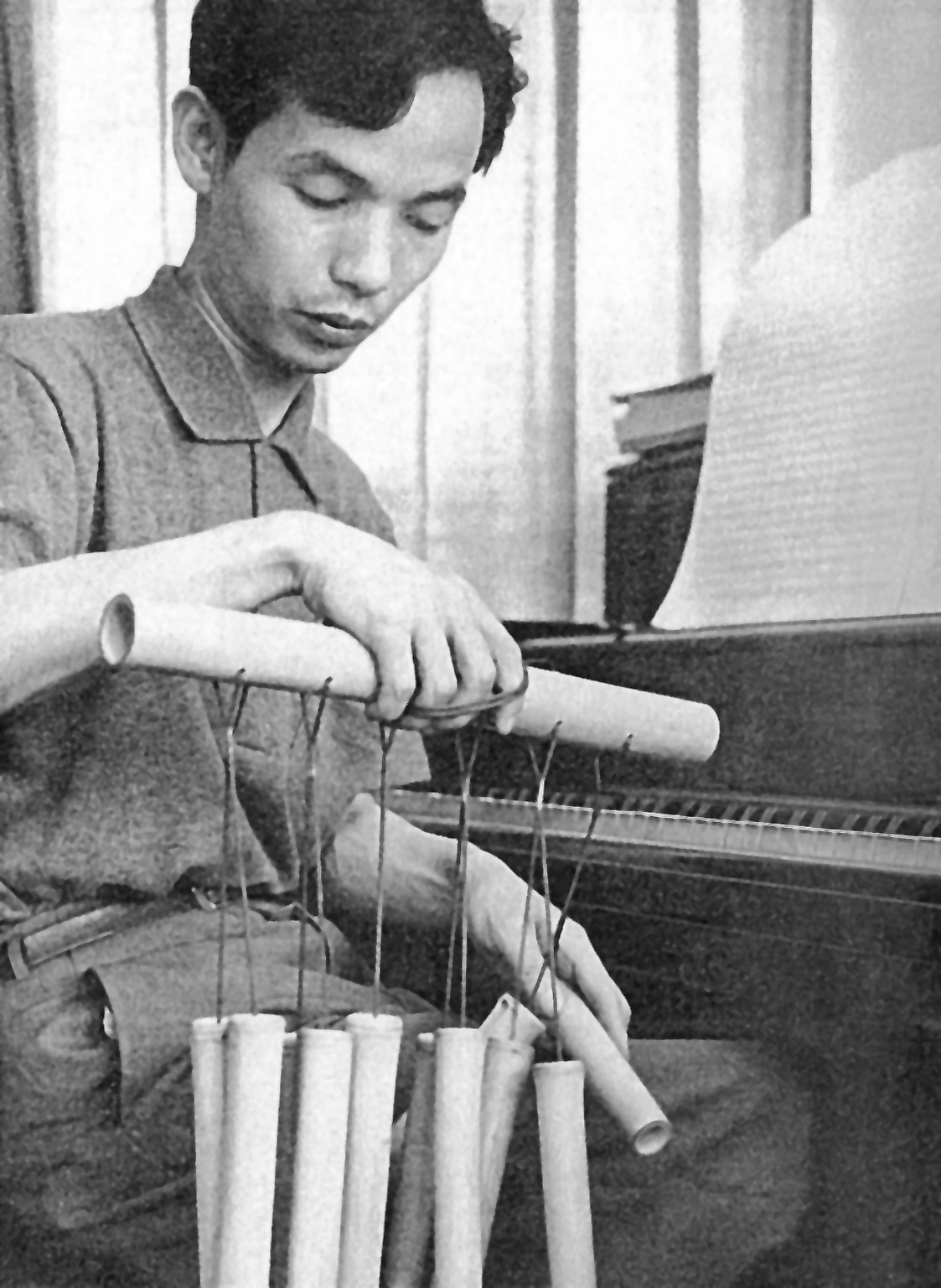
- Toru Takemitsu, 1961
- Period: Contemporary
- Composed: 1971
- Duration: c. 6 minutes
- Scoring: Solo flute

Premiere
- Location: Tokyo
- Performers: Aurèle Nicolet

Voice is a 1971 composition for solo flute by Tōru Takemitsu. The piece was composed on April 8, 1971, finished in one day, and it was premiered two months later by in Tokyo by Swiss flautist Aurèle Nicolet, by whom the piece was commissioned. A performance of the piece typically lasts around six minutes. It is divided into three sections: "Encounter", "Active", and "Calm".

== Composition ==
Voice is notable for its use of extended techniques for the flute, including key slaps, multiphonics, and a variety of articulations. While writing the piece, Takemitsu likely consulted Bruno Bartolozzi's book New Sounds for Woodwinds.

As suggested by the piece's title, the flautist is required to speak sing, shout, hum, growl, and click the tongue throughout the piece. Over the course of the work, a spoken text is also delivered; for this, Takemitsu used a line from the poem Handmade Proverbs by Shuzo Takiguchi, first recited in French and then in English: "Qui va là? Qui que tu sois, parle, transparence! (Who goes there? Speak, transparence, whoever you are!)"

Voice also shows influences from Japanese music and theater, with comparisons being drawn to shakuhachi music and Noh.
