= Toward the Sea =

Composition by Toru Takemitsu

Toward the Sea (海へ, Umi e) is a work by Japanese composer Tōru Takemitsu, commissioned by Greenpeace for the Save the Whales campaign.

== Form ==
The S–E–A motif appears in the work in various forms.

Towards the Sea exists in three separate versions:

- The first (Towards the Sea I), was composed in 1981 for alto flute and guitar. This was later rearranged for alto flute and marimba.
- The second (Towards the Sea II), also composed in 1981, is for alto flute, harp and string orchestra.
- The third (Towards the Sea III), written in 1989, is for alto flute and harp, without orchestra.

Each version lasts around 11 minutes.

The work is divided into three sections – The Night, Moby-Dick, and Cape Cod. These titles are in reference to Herman Melville's novel Moby Dick, or The Whale. Takemitsu wished to emphasize the spiritual dimension of the book, quoting the passage, "meditation and water are wedded together". He also said that, "The music is a homage to the sea which creates all things and a sketch for the sea of tonality"; Toward the Sea was written at a time when Takemitsu was increasingly returning to tonality after a period of experimental composition.

Most of the work is written in free time, with no bar lines (except in the second version, to facilitate conducting). In each version, the flute has the primary melodic line, based in part on a motif spelling "sea" in German musical notation: E♭–E–A. This motif reappeared in several of Takemitsu's later works.
