= Tōru Takemitsu =

Japanese composer and writer (1930–1996)

- 武満 徹
- Born: 8 October 1930; Hongō, Tokyo, Japan
- Died: 20 February 1996 (aged 65); Minato, Tokyo, Japan
- Occupations: Composer; writer

Tōru Takemitsu (武満 徹; pronounced [takeꜜmitsɯ̥ toːɾɯ]; 8 October 1930 – 20 February 1996) was a Japanese composer of contemporary classical music and writer on music. Largely self-taught, Takemitsu was admired for his subtle manipulation of instrumental and orchestral timbre.

In his early years, Takemitsu was also a founding member of the Jikken Kōbō (実験工房, experimental workshop) in Japan, a group of avant-garde artists who distanced themselves from academia and whose collaborative work is often regarded among the most influential of the 20th century.

His 1957 Requiem for string orchestra attracted international attention, led to several commissions from across the world and established his reputation as the leading 20th-century Japanese composer. He was the recipient of numerous awards and honours and founded the Toru Takemitsu Composition Award.

== Biography ==
=== Youth ===
Tōru Takemitsu was born on 8 October 1930 in the northern Hongō district of Tokyo. The family moved a month later to the then Japanese-controlled Dalian, Manchuria, where Tōru's father Takeo Takemitsu, was a government official. After his father's early death in 1938, Tōru's mother Reiko sent him back to Japan to attend elementary (1938–1943) and middle school (1944). He lived with an aunt and uncle, again in Hongō, Tokyo but his education was cut short aged fourteen by the Japanese Nationalist government's military conscription, which he described as an "extremely bitter" experience. Takemitsu first became conscious of Western classical music during his term of military service, in the form of a popular French Song ("Parlez-moi d'amour") which he listened to with colleagues in secret, played on a gramophone with a makeshift needle fashioned from bamboo.

During the post-war U.S. occupation of Japan, Takemitsu worked for the U.S. Armed Forces, but was ill for a long period. Hospitalised and bedridden with tuberculosis, he took the opportunity to listen to as much Western music as he could on the U.S. Armed Forces network. While deeply affected by these experiences of Western music, he simultaneously felt a need to distance himself from the traditional music of his native Japan. He explained much later, in a lecture at the New York International Festival of the Arts, that for him Japanese traditional music "always recalled the bitter memories of war".

Despite his lack of musical training, Takemitsu began to compose in earnest at the age of 16, taking inspiration from what little Western music he had heard: "... I began [writing] music attracted to music itself as one human being. Being in music I found my raison d'être as a man. After the war, music was the only thing. Choosing to be in music clarified my identity." Though he studied briefly with Yasuji Kiyose beginning in 1948, Takemitsu remained largely self-taught throughout his musical career.

=== Early development and Jikken Kōbō ===
In 1948, Takemitsu conceived the idea of electroacoustic music technology, or in his own words, to "bring noise into tempered musical tones inside a busy small tube." During the 1950s, he had learned that in the same year "a French [engineer] Pierre Schaeffer invented the method(s) of musique concrète based on the same idea as [his]", and was pleased by the coincidence.

Takemitsu was a founding member of the anti-academic Jikken Kōbō (実験工房, experimental workshop): an artistic group established in 1951 for multidisciplinary collaboration on mixed-media projects, who sought to avoid Japanese artistic tradition. The performances and works undertaken by the group introduced several contemporary Western composers to Japanese audiences. During this period he wrote Saegirarenai Kyūsoku I (Uninterrupted Rest I, 1952: a piano work, without a regular rhythmic pulse or barlines); and by 1955 Takemitsu had begun to use electronic tape-recording techniques in such works as Relief Statique (1955) and Vocalism A·I (1956). Takemitsu was also assistant to the composer Fumio Hayasaka around this time, who was perhaps best known for his scores for the films Rashomon and Seven Samurai by Akira Kurosawa; Takemitsu would collaborate with Kurosawa himself decades later.

In the late 1950s chance brought Takemitsu international attention: his Requiem for string orchestra (1957), written as an homage to Hayasaka, was heard by Igor Stravinsky in 1958 during his visit to Japan. (The NHK had organised opportunities for Stravinsky to listen to some of the latest Japanese music; when Takemitsu's work was put on by mistake, Stravinsky insisted on hearing it to the end.) At a press conference later, Stravinsky expressed his admiration for the work, praising its "sincerity" and "passionate" writing. Stravinsky subsequently invited Takemitsu to lunch; and for Takemitsu this was an "unforgettable" experience. After Stravinsky returned to the U.S., Takemitsu soon received a commission for a new work from the Koussevitsky Foundation which, he assumed, had come as a suggestion from Stravinsky to Aaron Copland. For this he composed Dorian Horizon, (1966), which was premièred by the San Francisco Symphony, conducted by Copland.

=== Influence of Cage; interest in traditional Japanese music ===
During his time with Jikken Kōbō, Takemitsu came into contact with the experimental work of John Cage; but when the composer Toshi Ichiyanagi returned from his studies in America in 1961, he gave the first Japanese performance of Cage's Concert for Piano and Orchestra. This left a "deep impression" on Takemitsu: he recalled the impact of hearing the work when writing an obituary for Cage, 31 years later. This encouraged Takemitsu in his use of indeterminate procedures and graphic-score notation, for example in the graphic scores of Ring (1961), Corona for pianist(s) and Corona II for string(s) (both 1962). In these works each performer is presented with cards printed with coloured circular patterns which are freely arranged by the performer to create "the score".

Although the immediate influence of Cage's procedures did not last in Takemitsu's music—Coral Island, for example for soprano and orchestra (1962) shows significant departures from indeterminate procedures partly as a result of Takemitsu's renewed interest in the music of Anton Webern—certain similarities between Cage's philosophies and Takemitsu's thought remained. For example, Cage's emphasis on timbres within individual sound-events, and his notion of silence "as plenum rather than vacuum", can be aligned with Takemitsu's interest in ma. Furthermore, Cage's interest in Zen practice (through his contact with Zen scholar Daisetz Teitaro Suzuki) seems to have resulted in a renewed interest in the East in general, and ultimately alerted Takemitsu to the potential for incorporating elements drawn from Japanese traditional music into his composition:

I must express my deep and sincere gratitude to John Cage. The reason for this is that in my own life, in my own development, for a long period I struggled to avoid being "Japanese", to avoid "Japanese" qualities. It was largely through my contact with John Cage that I came to recognize the value of my own tradition.

For Takemitsu, as he explained later in a lecture in 1988, one performance of Japanese traditional music stood out:

One day I chanced to see a performance of the Bunraku puppet theater and was very surprised by it. It was in the tone quality, the timbre, of the futazao shamisen, the wide-necked shamisen used in Bunraku, that I first recognized the splendor of traditional Japanese music. I was very moved by it and I wondered why my attention had never been captured before by this Japanese music.

Thereafter, he resolved to study all types of traditional Japanese music, paying special attention to the differences between the two very different musical traditions, in a diligent attempt to "bring forth the sensibilities of Japanese music that had always been within [him]". This was no easy task, since in the years following the war traditional music was largely overlooked and ignored: only one or two "masters" continued to keep their art alive, often meeting with public indifference. In conservatoria across the country, even students of traditional instruments were always required to learn the piano.

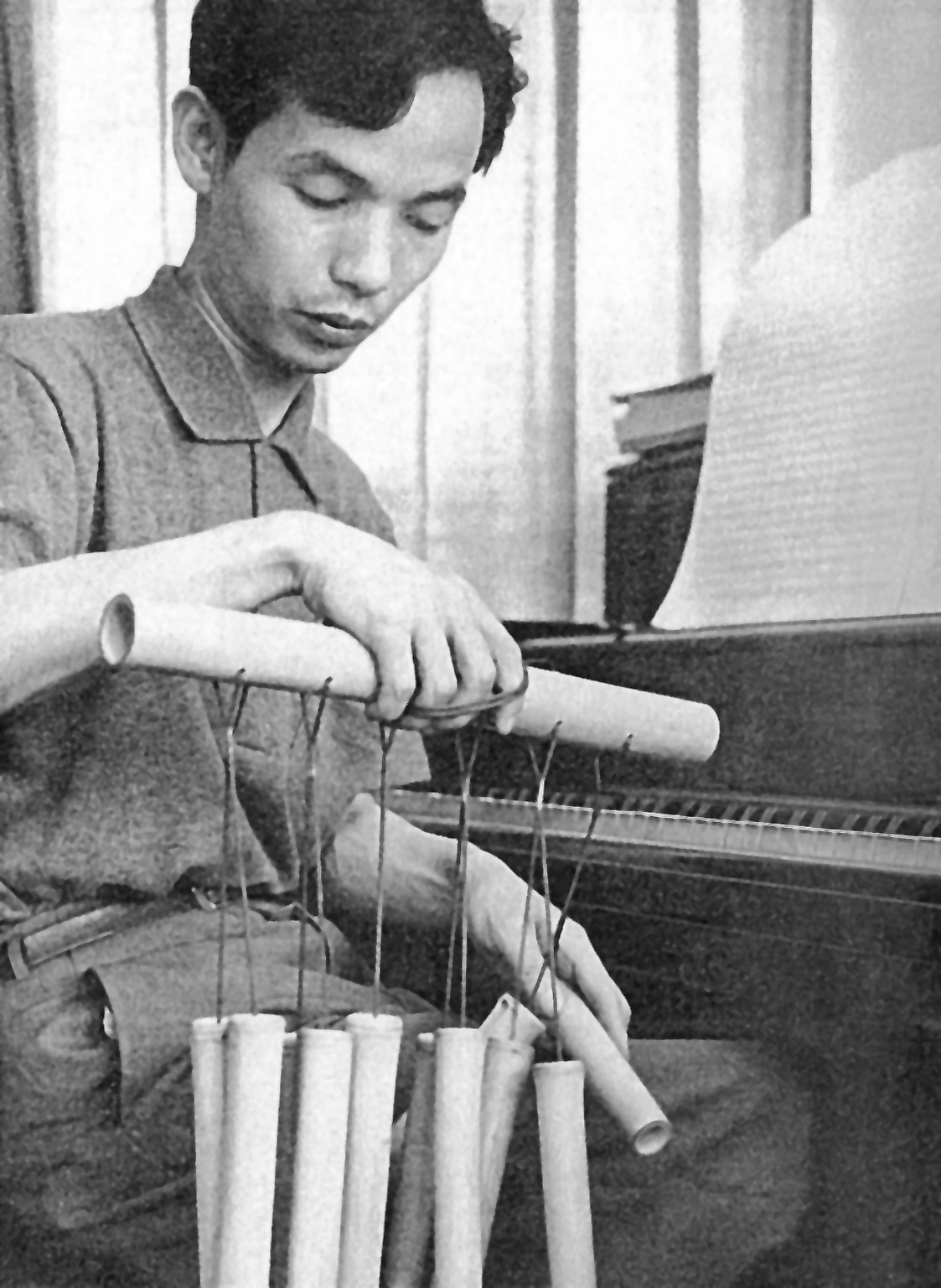
Takemitsu, 1961

From the early 1960s, Takemitsu began to make use of traditional Japanese instruments in his music, and even took up playing the biwa—an instrument he used in his score for the film Seppuku (1962). In 1967, Takemitsu received a commission from the New York Philharmonic, to commemorate the orchestra's 125th anniversary, for which he wrote November Steps for biwa, shakuhachi, and orchestra. Initially, Takemitsu had great difficulty in uniting these instruments from such different musical cultures in one work. Eclipse for biwa and shakuhachi (1966) illustrates Takemitsu's attempts to find a viable notational system for these instruments, which in normal circumstances neither sound together nor are used in works notated in any system of Western staff notation.

The first performance of November Steps was given in 1967, under Seiji Ozawa. Despite the trials of writing such an ambitious work, Takemitsu maintained "that making the attempt was very worthwhile because what resulted somehow liberated music from a certain stagnation and brought to music something distinctly new and different". The work was distributed widely in the West when it was coupled as the fourth side of an LP release of Messiaen's Turangalîla Symphony.

In 1972, Takemitsu, accompanied by Iannis Xenakis, Betsy Jolas, and others, heard Balinese gamelan music in Bali. The experience influenced the composer on a largely philosophical and theological level. For those accompanying Takemitsu on the expedition (most of whom were French musicians), who "... could not keep their composure as I did before this music: it was too foreign for them to be able to assess the resulting discrepancies with their logic", the experience was without precedent. For Takemitsu, however, by now quite familiar with his own native musical tradition, there was a relationship between "the sounds of the gamelan, the tone of the kapachi, the unique scales and rhythms by which they are formed, and Japanese traditional music which had shaped such a large part of my sensitivity". In his solo piano work For Away (written for Roger Woodward in 1973), a single, complex line is distributed between the pianist's hands, which reflects the interlocking patterns between the metallophones of a gamelan orchestra.

A year later, Takemitsu returned to the instrumental combination of shakuhachi, biwa, and orchestra, in the less well known work Autumn (1973). The significance of this work is revealed in its far greater integration of the traditional Japanese instruments into the orchestral discourse; whereas in November Steps, the two contrasting instrumental ensembles perform largely in alternation, with only a few moments of contact. Takemitsu expressed this change in attitude:

But now my attitude is getting to be a little different, I think. Now my concern is mostly to find out what there is in common ... Autumn was written after November Steps. I really wanted to do something which I hadn't done in November Steps, not to blend the instruments, but to integrate them.

=== International status and the gradual shift in style ===
By 1970, Takemitsu's reputation as a leading member of avant-garde community was well established, and during his involvement with Expo '70 in Osaka, he was at last able to meet more of his Western colleagues, including Karlheinz Stockhausen. Also, during a contemporary music festival in April 1970, produced by the Japanese composer himself ("Iron and Steel Pavilion"), Takemitsu met among the participants Lukas Foss, Peter Sculthorpe, and Vinko Globokar. Later that year, as part of a commission from Paul Sacher and the Zurich Collegium Musicum, Takemitsu incorporated into his Eucalypts I parts for international performers: flautist Aurèle Nicolet, oboist Heinz Holliger, and harpist Ursula Holliger.

Critical examination of the complex instrumental works written during this period for the new generation of "contemporary soloists" reveals the level of his high-profile engagement with the Western avant-garde, in works such as Voice for solo flute (1971), Waves for clarinet, horn, two trombones and bass drum (1976), Quatrain for clarinet, violin, cello, piano and orchestra (1977). Experiments and works that incorporated traditional Japanese musical ideas and language continued to appear in his output, and an increased interest in the traditional Japanese garden began to reflect itself in works such as In an Autumn Garden for gagaku orchestra (1973), and A Flock Descends into the Pentagonal Garden for orchestra (1977).

In 1975, Takemitsu was a visiting professor at Yale University.

Throughout this apogee of avant-garde work, Takemitsu's musical style seems to have undergone a series of stylistic changes. Comparison of Green (for orchestra, 1967) and A Flock Descends into the Pentagonal Garden (1977) quickly reveals the seeds of this change. The latter was composed according to a pre-compositional scheme, in which pentatonic modes were superimposed over one central pentatonic scale (the so-called "black-key pentatonic") around a central sustained central pitch (F-sharp), and an approach that is highly indicative of the sort of "pantonal" and modal pitch material seen gradually emerging in his works throughout the 1970s. The former, Green (or November Steps II) written 10 years earlier, is heavily influenced by Debussy, and is, in spite of its very dissonant language (including momentary quarter-tone clusters), largely constructed through a complex web of modal forms. These modal forms are largely audible, particularly in the momentary repose toward the end of the work. His friend and colleague Jō Kondō said, "If his later works sound different from earlier pieces, it is due to his gradual refining of his basic style rather than any real alteration of it."

=== Later works: the sea of tonality ===
In a Tokyo lecture given in 1984, Takemitsu identified a melodic motive in his Far Calls. Coming Far! (for violin and orchestra, 1980) that would recur throughout his later works:

I wanted to plan a tonal "sea". Here the "sea" is E-flat [Es in German nomenclature]-E-A, a three-note ascending motive consisting of a half step and perfect fourth. [... In Far Calls] this is extended upward from A with two major thirds and one minor third ... Using these patterns I set the "sea of tonality" from which many pantonal chords flow. (Note: Takemitsu 1995, p. 112)

Takemitsu's words here highlight his changing stylistic trends from the late 1970s into the 1980s, which have been described as "an increased use of diatonic material [... with] references to tertian harmony and jazz voicing", which do not, however, project a sense of "large-scale tonality". Many of the works from this period have titles that include a reference to water: Toward the Sea (1981), Rain Tree and Rain Coming (1982), riverrun and I Hear the Water Dreaming (1987). Takemitsu wrote in his notes for the score of Rain Coming that "... the complete collection [is] entitled "Waterscape" ... it was the composer's intention to create a series of works, which like their subject, pass through various metamorphoses, culminating in a sea of tonality."

His 1981 work for orchestra named Dreamtime was inspired by a visit to Groote Eylandt, off the coast of the Northern Territory of Australia, to witness a large gathering of Australian indigenous dancers, singers and story tellers. He was there at the invitation of the choreographer Jiří Kylián.

Pedal notes played an increasingly prominent role in Takemitsu's music during this period, as in A Flock Descends into the Pentagonal Garden. In Dream/Window, (orchestra, 1985) a pedal D serves as anchor point, holding together statements of a striking four-note motivic gesture which recurs in various instrumental and rhythmic guises throughout. Very occasionally, fully fledged references to diatonic tonality can be found, often in harmonic allusions to early- and pre-20th-century composers—for example, Folios for guitar (1974), which quotes from J. S. Bach's St Matthew Passion, and Family Tree for narrator and orchestra (1984), which invokes the musical language of Maurice Ravel and American popular song. (He revered the St Matthew Passion, and would play through it on the piano before commencing a new work, as a form of "purificatory ritual".

By this time, Takemitsu's incorporation of traditional Japanese (and other Eastern) musical traditions with his Western style had become much more integrated. Takemitsu commented, "There is no doubt ... the various countries and cultures of the world have begun a journey toward the geographic and historic unity of all peoples ... The old and new exist within me with equal weight."

Toward the end of his life, Takemitsu had planned to complete an opera, a collaboration with the novelist Barry Gifford and the director Daniel Schmid, commissioned by the Opéra National de Lyon in France. He was in the process of publishing a plan of its musical and dramatic structure with Kenzaburō Ōe, but he was prevented from completing it by his death at 65. Takemitsu died of pneumonia on 20 February 1996 in Tokyo; he had been living with bladder cancer since the year prior.

== Music ==
Composers whom Takemitsu cited as influential in his early work include Claude Debussy, Anton Webern, Edgard Varèse, Arnold Schoenberg, and Olivier Messiaen. Messiaen in particular was introduced to him by fellow composer Toshi Ichiyanagi, and remained a lifelong influence. Although Takemitsu's wartime experiences of nationalism initially discouraged him from cultivating an interest in traditional Japanese music, he showed an early interest in "... the Japanese Garden in color spacing and form ...". The formal garden of the kaiyu-shiki interested him in particular.

He expressed his unusual stance toward compositional theory early on, his lack of respect for the "trite rules of music, rules that are ... stifled by formulas and calculations"; for Takemitsu it was of far greater importance that "sounds have the freedom to breathe. ... Just as one cannot plan his life, neither can he plan music".

Takemitsu's sensitivity to instrumental and orchestral timbre can be heard throughout his work, and is often made apparent by the unusual instrumental combinations he specified. This is evident in works such as November Steps, that combine traditional Japanese instruments, shakuhachi and biwa, with a conventional Western orchestra. It may also be discerned in his works for ensembles that make no use of traditional instruments, for example Quotation of Dream (1991), Archipelago S., for 21 players (1993), and Arc I & II (1963–66/1976). In these works, the more conventional orchestral forces are divided into unconventional "groups". Even where these instrumental combinations were determined by the particular ensemble commissioning the work, "Takemitsu's genius for instrumentation (and genius it was, in my view) ...", in the words of Oliver Knussen, "... creates the illusion that the instrumental restrictions are self-imposed".

=== Influence of traditional Japanese music ===
Example 1. Bar 10 of Masque I, Continu, for two flutes (1959). An early example of Takemitsu's incorporation of traditional Japanese music in his writing, shown in the unusually notated quarter-tone pitch bend above.

Takemitsu summarized his initial aversion to Japanese (and all non-Western) traditional musical forms in his own words: "There may be folk music with strength and beauty, but I cannot be completely honest in this kind of music. I want a more active relationship to the present. (Folk music in a 'contemporary style' is nothing but a deception)." His dislike for the musical traditions of Japan in particular were intensified by his experiences of the war, during which Japanese music became associated with militaristic and nationalistic cultural ideals.

Nevertheless, Takemitsu incorporated some idiomatic elements of Japanese music in his very earliest works, perhaps unconsciously. One unpublished set of pieces, Kakehi ("Conduit"), written at the age of seventeen, incorporates the ryō, ritsu and insen scales throughout. When Takemitsu discovered that these "nationalist" elements had somehow found their way into his music, he was so alarmed that he later destroyed the works. Further examples can be seen for example in the quarter-tone glissandi of Masques I (for two flutes, 1959), which mirror the characteristic pitch bends of the shakuhachi, and for which he devised his own unique notation: a held note is tied to an enharmonic spelling of the same pitch class, with a portamento direction across the tie.

Example 2. Opening bars of Litany—In Memory of Michael Vyner, i Adagio, for solo piano (1950/1989). Another early example of Takemitsu's incorporation of traditional Japanese music in his writing, shown here in the use of the Japanese in scale in the upper melodic line of the right hand part.

Other Japanese characteristics, including the further use of traditional pentatonic scales, continued to crop up elsewhere in his early works. In the opening bars of Litany, for Michael Vyner, a reconstruction from memory by Takemitsu of Lento in Due Movimenti (1950; the original score was lost), pentatonicism is clearly visible in the upper voice, which opens the work on an unaccompanied anacrusis. The pitches of the opening melody combine to form the constituent notes of the ascending form of the Japanese in scale.

When, from the early 1960s, Takemitsu began to "consciously apprehend" the sounds of traditional Japanese music, he found that his creative process, "the logic of my compositional thought[,] was torn apart", and nevertheless, "hogaku [traditional Japanese music ...] seized my heart and refuses to release it". In particular, Takemitsu perceived that, for example, the sound of a single stroke of the biwa or single pitch breathed through the shakuhachi, could "so transport our reason because they are of extreme complexity ... already complete in themselves". This fascination with the sounds produced in traditional Japanese music brought Takemitsu to his idea of ma (usually translated as the space between two objects), which ultimately informed his understanding of the intense quality of traditional Japanese music as a whole:

Just one sound can be complete in itself, for its complexity lies in the formulation of ma, an unquantifiable metaphysical space (duration) of dynamically tensed absence of sound. For example, in the performance of nō, the ma of sound and silence does not have an organic relation for the purpose of artistic expression. Rather, these two elements contrast sharply with one another in an immaterial balance.

In 1970, Takemitsu received a commission from the National Theatre of Japan to write a work for the gagaku ensemble of the Imperial Household; this was fulfilled in 1973, when he completed Shuteiga ("In an Autumn Garden", although he later incorporated the work, as the fourth movement, into his 50-minute-long "In an Autumn Garden—Complete Version"). As well as being "... the furthest removed from the West of any work he had written", While it introduces certain Western musical ideas to the Japanese court ensemble, the work represents the deepest of Takemitsu's investigations into Japanese musical tradition, the lasting effects of which are clearly reflected in his works for conventional Western ensemble formats that followed.

Example 3. Standard chords produced by the shō, mouth organ of the traditional Japanese court ensemble, gagaku

In Garden Rain (1974, for brass ensemble), the limited and pitch-specific harmonic vocabulary of the Japanese mouth organ, the shō (see ex. 3), and its specific timbres, are clearly emulated in Takemitsu's writing for brass instruments; even similarities of performance practice can be seen, (the players are often required to hold notes to the limit of their breath capacity). In A Flock Descends into the Pentagonal Garden, the characteristic timbres of the shō and its chords (several of which are simultaneous soundings of traditional Japanese pentatonic scales) are emulated in the opening held chords of the wind instruments (the first chord is in fact an exact transposition of the shō's chord, Jū (i); see ex. 3); meanwhile a solo oboe is assigned a melodic line that is similarly reminiscent of the lines played by the hichiriki in gagaku ensembles.

=== Influence of Messiaen ===
Example 4. Comparison of ex.94 from Olivier Messiaen's Technique de mon langage musical and one of the principal motives from Takemitsu's Quatrain (1975)

The influence of Olivier Messiaen on Takemitsu was already apparent in some of Takemitsu's earliest published works. By the time he composed Lento in Due Movimenti, (1950), Takemitsu had already come into possession of a copy of Messiaen's 8 Préludes (through Toshi Ichiyanagi), and the influence of Messiaen is clearly visible in the work, in the use of modes, the suspension of regular metre, and sensitivity to timbre. Throughout his career, Takemitsu often made use of modes from which he derived his musical material, both melodic and harmonic among which Messiaen's modes of limited transposition to appear with some frequency. In particular, the use of the octatonic, (mode II, or the 8–28 collection), and mode VI (8–25) is particularly common. However, Takemitsu pointed out that he had used the octatonic collection in his music before ever coming across it in Messiaen's music.

In 1975, Takemitsu met Messiaen in New York, and during "what was to be a one-hour 'lesson' [but which] lasted three hours ... Messiaen played his Quartet for the End of Time for Takemitsu at the piano", which, Takemitsu recalled, was like listening to an orchestral performance. Takemitsu responded to this with his homage to the French composer, Quatrain, for which he asked Messiaen's permission to use the same instrumental combination for the main quartet, cello, violin, clarinet and piano (which is accompanied by orchestra). As well as the obvious similarity of instrumentation, Takemitsu employs several melodic figures that appear to "mimic" certain musical examples given by Messiaen in his Technique de mon langage musical, (see ex. 4). In 1977, Takemitsu reworked the solo quartet parts from Quatrain, without orchestra, and titled the new work Quatrain II.

On hearing of Messiaen's death in 1992, Takemitsu was interviewed by telephone, and still in shock, "blurted out, 'His death leaves a crisis in contemporary music!'" Then later, in an obituary written for the French composer in the same year, Takemitsu further expressed his sense of loss at Messiaen's death: "Truly, he was my spiritual mentor ... Among the many things I learned from his music, the concept and experience of color and the form of time will be unforgettable." The composition Rain Tree Sketch II, which was to be Takemitsu's final piano piece, was also written that year and subtitled "In Memoriam Olivier Messiaen".

=== Influence of Debussy ===
Takemitsu frequently expressed his indebtedness to Claude Debussy, referring to the French composer as his "great mentor". As Arnold Whittall puts it:

Given the enthusiasm for the exotic and the Orient in these [Debussy and Messiaen] and other French composers, it is understandable that Takemitsu should have been attracted to the expressive and formal qualities of music in which flexibility of rhythm and richness of harmony count for so much.

For Takemitsu, Debussy's "greatest contribution was his unique orchestration which emphasizes colour, light and shadow ... the orchestration of Debussy has many musical focuses." He was fully aware of Debussy's own interest in Japanese art, (the cover of the first edition of La mer, for example, was famously adorned by Hokusai's The Great Wave off Kanagawa). For Takemitsu, this interest in Japanese culture, combined with his unique personality, and perhaps most importantly, his lineage as a composer of the French musical tradition running from Rameau and Lully through Berlioz in which colour is given special attention, gave Debussy his unique style and sense of orchestration. (Note: Takemitsu 1995, p. 110)

During the composition of Green (November Steps II, for orchestra, 1967: "steeped in the sound-color world of the orchestral music of Claude Debussy") Takemitsu said he had taken the scores of Debussy's Prélude à l'Après-midi d'un Faune and Jeux to the mountain villa where both this work and November Steps I were composed. For Oliver Knussen, "the final appearance of the main theme irresistibly prompts the thought that Takemitsu may, quite unconsciously, have been attempting a latter-day Japanese Après-midi d'un Faune". Details of orchestration in Green, such as the prominent use of antique cymbals, and tremolandi harmonies in the strings, clearly point to the influence of Takemitsu's compositional mentor, and of these works in particular.

In Quotation of Dream (1991), direct quotations from Debussy's La Mer and Takemitsu's earlier works relating to the sea are incorporated into the musical flow ("stylistic jolts were not intended"), depicting the landscape outside the Japanese garden of his own music.

=== Motives ===
Several recurring musical motives can be heard in Takemitsu's works. In particular the pitch motive E♭–E–A can be heard in many of his later works, whose titles refer to water in some form (Toward the Sea, 1981; Rain Tree Sketch, 1982; I Hear the Water Dreaming, 1987).

Example 5. Various examples of Takemitsu's S–E–A motive, derived from the German spelling of the notes E♭, E, A ("Es–E–A")

When spelt in German (Es–E–A), the motive can be seen as a musical "transliteration" of the word "sea". Takemitsu used this motive (usually transposed) to indicate the presence of water in his "musical landscapes", even in works whose titles do not directly refer to water, such as A Flock Descends into the Pentagonal Garden (1977; see ex. 5).

=== Musique concrète ===
Water Music

During Takemitsu's years as a member of the Jikken Kōbō, he experimented with compositions of musique concrète (and a very limited amount of electronic music, the most notable example being Stanza II for harp and tape written later in 1972). In Water Music (1960), Takemitsu's source material consisted entirely of sounds produced by droplets of water. His manipulation of these sounds, through the use of highly percussive envelopes, often results in a resemblance to traditional Japanese instruments, such as the tsuzumi and nō ensembles.

=== Aleatory techniques ===
One aspect of John Cage's compositional procedure that Takemitsu continued to use throughout his career, was the use of indeterminacy, in which performers are given a degree of choice in what to perform. As mentioned previously, this was particularly used in works such as November Steps, in which musicians playing traditional Japanese instruments were able to play in an orchestral setting with a certain degree of improvisational freedom.

A Flock Descends Into the Pentagonal Garden

However, he also employed a technique that is sometimes called "aleatory counterpoint" in his well-known orchestral work A Flock Descends Into the Pentagonal Garden (1977, at [J] in the score), and in the score of Arc II: i Textures (1964) for piano and orchestra, in which sections of the orchestra are divided into groups, and required to repeat short passages of music at will. In these passages the overall sequence of events is, however, controlled by the conductor, who is instructed about the approximate durations for each section, and who indicates to the orchestra when to move from one section to next. The technique is commonly found in the work of Witold Lutosławski, who pioneered it in his Jeux vénitiens.

=== Film music ===
Takemitsu's contribution to film music was considerable; in under 40 years he composed music for over 100 films, some of which were written for purely financial reasons (such as those written for Noboru Nakamura). However, as the composer attained financial independence, he grew more selective, often reading whole scripts before agreeing to compose the music, and later surveying the action on set, "breathing the atmosphere" whilst conceiving his musical ideas.

One notable consideration in Takemitsu's composition for film was his careful use of silence (also important in many of his concert works), which often immediately intensifies the events on screen, and prevents any monotony through a continuous musical accompaniment. For the first battle scene of Akira Kurosawa's Ran, Takemitsu provided an extended passage of intense elegiac quality that halts at the sound of a single gunshot, leaving the audience with the pure "sounds of battle: cries screams and neighing horses".

Takemitsu attached the greatest importance to the director's conception of the film; in an interview with Max Tessier, he explained that, "everything depends on the film itself ... I try to concentrate as much as possible on the subject, so that I can express what the director feels himself. I try to extend his feelings with my music."

== Legacy ==
"His sudden death has left us a double legacy, a hugely varied output of exceptionally refined music whose popularity shows no sign of diminishing; and through his energetically altruistic work as festival director and concert organiser and sometime impresario, an irreplaceable contribution to the cultural life of Japan."

— Julian Anderson in 1996

Takemitsu is often described as the leading Japanese composer of contemporary classical music, from the postwar period onwards. Commentators also recognize him as the first Japanese composer to achieve international renown; his colleague Witold Lutosławski described him simply as "a leading figure of contemporary music". On such epithets, Takemitsu scholar James Siddons is cautionary, remarking that although "at the time of his death [...] Takemitsu was considered the leading Japanese composer. All three words in that accolade require comment." Siddons notes important caveats: Takemitsu was scarcely involved with traditional Japanese music, and his classical composition career is inseparable from his careers in film scoring and writing. Musicologist Peter Burt concurs, noting that "it should always be borne in mind that these other areas of activity were an ever-present backdrop to his 'mainstream' work".

Alongside the Korean-German Isang Yun and Chinese-American Chou Wen-chung, Takemitsu became the figurehead of a new phenomenon: as 20th-century classical music increasingly permeated Asian cultures, a new generation of composers sought reconciliation between these new influences and their native music. Within Japan, ethnomusicologist David W. Hughes reckons that Takemitsu stands with conductor Seiji Ozawa and pianist Mitsuko Uchida as the best-known native figures of Western classical music. Siddons described Takemitsu's death in 1996 as the end of a golden age in Japanese music, noting the recent death of the composer's colleague Minao Shibata (also in 1996) as well as earlier death of Kuniharu Akiyama (in 1995) and later one of Toshiro Mayuzumi (in 1997). On younger Japanese composers, Takemitsu was a major influence, particularly in his encouragement of writing for traditional Japanese instruments. Occasionally this influence was overwhelming, and composer Stephen Long suggests that Takemitsu's international renown led to the neglect of his Japanese contemporaries. (Note: Long likens Takemitsu's overwhelming dominance on his Japanese contemporaries to that of Messiaen and Boulez, whose prominence in France dwarfed the careers of composers like Jean Barraqué and Maurice Ohana.) Takemitsu scholar Alain Poirier also notes that "As his fame grew in the West, he was increasingly perceived as too Western by the younger generation of Japanese composers".

An "outsider to academia", Takemitsu never accepted a long-term university post and remarked in 1990 that "I don’t teach at all. I have no students at all, but I really love to talk with young musicians, young composers". Occasionally, musicians would study privately with him for short periods, including classical composers Robert Beaser, Chester Biscardi and Barry Conyngham, as well as the film composer Larry Groupé. Also among his students was the Chinese-American composer Tan Dun, who later became one of the most prominent figures of contemporary classical music. Dun later dedicated his Water Concerto (1998) in Takemitsu's memory. Other Takemitsu dedications include Hika: In Memoriam Takemitsu (1996) for solo guitar by Leo Brouwer; a Violin Concerto, In Memory of Toru Takemitsu (1996), by Joji Yuasa; and, inspired by Takemitsu's sketches, Prayer Bell Sketch (1997) for solo piano by Oliver Knussen. In 2006, jazz rock musicians Brandon Ross and Stomu Takeishi released an album inspired by Takemitsu's film scores, Quotation of Dream: for the Love and Soul of Toru Takemitsu.

Takemitsu was the concept advisor for the Tokyo Opera City Concert Hall (TOCCH), which opened in 1997 and was dedicated to his memory. TOCCH's organizing group, the Tokyo Opera City Cultural Foundation, founded the annual Toru Takemitsu Composition Award in collaboration with the composer. First inaugurated in 1997, Takemitsu devised a format distinct from similar competitions: rather than have a jury of composers judge submissions, a single composer would be appointed on a rotating basis. The first three judges were chosen by Takemitsu, Henri Dutilleux (1997), György Ligeti (1998) and Luciano Berio (1999); later judges have been selected by their predecessors. (Note: Henri Dutilleux explains: "Takemitsu's reasoning in setting up this new form of competition was no doubt that, when you bring together onto a jury composers of very different outlooks, each with their own personality, the result is often disappointing. So he preferred to leave the choice just to one person. In fact it is somewhat utopian to expect a group of composers to make the same choice, however good a piece may be.")

== Awards and honours ==
Takemitsu won awards for composition, both in Japan and abroad, including the Prix Italia for his orchestral work Tableau noir in 1958, the Otaka Prize in 1976 and 1981, the Los Angeles Film Critics Award in 1987 (for the film score Ran) and the University of Louisville Grawemeyer Award for Music Composition in 1994 (for Fantasma/Cantos). In Japan, he received the Film Awards of the Japanese Academy for outstanding achievement in music, for soundtracks to the following films:

- 1985 Fire Festival (火まつり)
- 1986 Ran (乱)
- 1989 Black Rain (黒い雨)
- 1989 Rikyu (利休)

He was also invited to attend numerous international festivals throughout his career, and presented lectures and talks at academic institutions across the world. He was made an honorary member of the Akademie der Künste of the DDR in 1979, and the American Institute of Arts and Letters in 1985. He was admitted to the French Ordre des Arts et des Lettres in 1985, and the Académie des Beaux-Arts in 1986. He was the recipient of the 22nd Suntory Music Award (1990). Posthumously, Takemitsu received an Honorary Doctorate from Columbia University in April 1996 and was awarded the fourth Glenn Gould Prize in fall 1996.

== Writings ==
- Takemitsu, Tōru (1995). Confronting Silence. Fallen Leaf Press. ISBN 978-0-914913-36-8.
- Takemitsu, Tōru, with Cronin, Tania and Tann, Hilary, "Afterword", Perspectives of New Music, vol. 27, no. 2 (Summer, 1989), 205–214, (subscription access) JSTOR 833411
- Takemitsu, Tōru, (trans. Adachi, Sumi with Reynolds, Roger), "Mirrors", Perspectives of New Music, vol. 30, no. 1 (Winter, 1992), 36–80, (subscription access) JSTOR 833284
- Takemitsu, Tōru, (trans. Hugh de Ferranti) "One Sound", Contemporary Music Review, vol. 8, part 2, (Harwood, 1994), 3–4, (subscription access) doi:10.1080/07494469400640021
- Takemitsu, Tōru, "Contemporary Music in Japan", Perspectives of New Music, vol. 27, no. 2 (Summer, 1989), 198–204 (subscription access) JSTOR 833410
