= Sogetsu Art Center =

Tokyo-based experimental art space 1958–1971

The Sōgetsu Art Center (SAC) was a Tokyo-based experimental art space. The center was established in 1958, and its activities ceased in 1971. It was founded by Sōfū Teshigahara, creator of the Sōgetsu-ryū (草月流), a school of ikebana (Japanese floral art), that he founded in 1927. It was directed by Teshigahara's son, Hiroshi Teshigahara.

It is considered a major hub for post-war Japanese art, especially for experimental and avant-garde activities. The SAC was a pivotal venue for those involved in the phenomenon of Tokyo pop, whether Japanese or international. Events held there brought together musicians, visual artists, designers, critics, and curators around multidisciplinary and collaborative events, on the margins of conventional art institutions. Activities at SAC converged towards a search for new forms of expression, at the crossroads of different artistic genres.

The SAC was also an international platform, providing a venue in which the Japanese art world witnessed happenings and Fluxus events (notably in performances by Toshi Ichiyanagi and Yoko Ono and works including Instructions for Paintings), or radical musical and artistic approaches (through the invitation of John Cage, David Tudor, Robert Rauschenberg). The ambition to highlight international art was central to the SAC creators' approach, which proved to be a complex undertaking, as Japanese avant-garde artists both idolized and destabilized the dominant cultural discourse created by figures such as Cage and Rauschenberg.

== History ==
=== Establishment ===
The Sōgetsu Art Center (SAC) was founded in 1958 and directed by Hiroshi Teshigahara, who was then known as an avant-garde film director. He received permission to use the auditorium/lecture hall in the newly constructed Sōgetsu Hall (headquarters of the Sōgetsu School of ikebana) in Tokyo's Akasaka district.

Sōfū Teshigahara was extremely supportive of the SAC and its activities from the beginning. He invited Georges Mathieu and Sam Francis to create mural paintings for the auditorium of Sōgetsu Hall. The history of this artistic commission was emblematic of the SAC's international ambitions and outlook: following the success of 1956's Sekai konnichi no bijutsu ("Art of Today's World ") exhibition held at Takashimaya Department Store and curated by critics Shin'ichi Segi and Michel Tapié, which set in motion what is known as the Anforumeru senpū ("Informel whirlwind'), Michel Tapié and Georges Mathieu came to Japan, at the invitation of Jirō Yoshihara and Sōfū Teshigahara.

=== Programming ===
The SAC space hosted a wide variety of activities: musical performances, film screenings, journal publishing, and educational space (study groups, workshops). The space was also made available to many artists, both local and international. For a modestly scaled institution, it instigated important changes in the local art scene by connecting Japanese artists and artists from abroad. Although, as outlined below, the SAC hosted diverse activities, its most consistent engagement over the course of its history tended to be with experimental music and film. Throughout its active years, SAC also enjoyed longstanding collaborations with many prominent graphic designers, including Kōhei Sugiura, Makoto Wada, Tadanori Yokoo, Akio Kanda, Ikkō Tanaka, and Kiyoshi Awazu, who designed posters and promotional materials for the center's activities.

==== 1958–1961 ====
In the early years, programs were divided into three categories: the first two were focused on music: the Sōgetsu Contemporary Series (avant-garde classical music) and the Sōgetsu Music Inn (jazz); and the third, the Sōgetsu Cinemathèque, primarily screened films. The program of the Sōgetsu Contemporary Series, for the first few years, was conducted by members of the Sakkyokuka Shūdan (Composer's Group), including composer Tōru Takemitsu and Toshirō Mayuzumi. The SAC's film activities can be traced back to 1957, when Hiroshi Teshigahara and fellow director Susumu Hani founded the Cinema 57 group, which screened independent films. Sōgetsu Cinemathèque was launched in 1961 and was the SAC's longest-running series. It showcased both new and experimental films as well as revisiting key films from history, such as silent films.

==== 1961–1965 ====
From around 1961–1965, the SAC greatly expanded its programming beyond the three earlier series and welcomed various creators. Notably, the center sponsored performances by prominent artists and musicians from outside Japan, including John Cage, David Tudor, Robert Rauschenberg, and Nam June Paik, as well as solo performances from Japanese artists and composers such as Yoko Ono, Toshi Ichiyanagi, and Tōru Takemitsu. These performances, all by creators with some connection to Fluxus, introduced these new ideas to a Japanese audience. Because of the international notoriety of Fluxus, these performances continue to be some of the best-known events that occurred at the SAC. Group Ongaku, a young Japanese ensemble that composed and played musique concrète, also performed at the SAC several times around this period, and via the SAC was able to connect with Ichiyanagi and establish contact with the international Fluxus network (see more on Group Ongaku below).

The SAC also expanded its film programming during this time. For example, the center hosted screenings of a new animation group known as Animeshon Sannin no Kai ("Association of Three Animators"), as well as three Animation Festivals which invited other animators inside and outside Japan to submit works for screening.

The SAC also experimented with hosting a variety of dance and theatrical performances. Major performances by international visitors included the Off-Broadway play The Coach with the Six Insides by Jean Erdman, and the first showcase in Japan by the Merce Cunningham Dance Company. There were noteworthy performances by Japanese creators as well, including dance recitals by Akiko Motofuji, Butoh works by Tatsumi Hijikata, works by Jūrō Kara’s Jōkyō Gekijō (Situation Theatre), plays by Tetsuji Takechi, and plays by Shūji Terayama. Members of the Hanayagi school of nihon buyō (traditional Japanese dance), including Suzushi Hanayagi, also performed at the SAC.

There was some effort made by the SAC to start its own experimental theatre series, but the Sōgetsu Experimental Theatre only hosted one performance, by Group NLT (today Gekidan NLT), in 1964.

==== 1965–1971 ====
After 1965, the SAC programming shifted to mostly focus on film, with less activity in the performing arts, although there were still some notable performances of works by Shūji Terayama and others. The SAC launched several new film festivals, including the Sekai Zen’ei Eiga-sai ("World Avant-garde Film Festival"), the Underground Film Festival, the Sōgetsu Experimental Film Festival, and the Film Art Festival. Although these new film festivals underscored the SAC's support for avant-garde artists, the 1969 Film Art Festival was forced to shut down when several violent factions of the underground film scene occupied the auditorium and called for the festival's destruction. Although some of the SAC affiliates were able to de-escalate the mob, whose actual goals were unclear, the festival nevertheless closed. Yuji Takahashi states "When I returned to Japan briefly in 1969 and visited the Sōgetsu Art Center, the Cinemathèque venue was occupied in the midst of a protest rally with no end in sight. And so the art movements of the sixties came to an end."

In the last few years of the SAC, most events were screenings part of the Sōgetsu Cinemathèque. In April 1971, the center closed, ending a significant period in avant-garde art in Tokyo.

== Philosophy ==
Although he was the director of SAC, Hiroshi Teshigahara advocated a collaborative and horizontal approach: "I had always been involved with activities that mixed up and brought together various art forms. So the art center was something that really concretized what I had been thinking about for a while. One thing that I insisted on was that it wasn't going to be a place where I would call on artists and ask them to do things. I really wanted people to come here on their own, and find it to be a place where they could be spontaneous and experiment. The artists themselves are the real producers... I think it was probably the first time that any organization was able to sustain and continue this sort of thing." Like the Yomiuri Indépendant Exhibition (1949-1964), the goal (self-described) was to offer artists a "safe haven from the storm of capitalism that controlled the art market."

In connection to this horizontal approach, the SAC consistently attempted to blur the boundaries between different genres of art. The artist Kuniharu Akiyama explained that the SAC was "a forum for the interchange of each genre of art, it was a departure point for us to think about new integrated artworks and the integration of different arts." This impulse is visible even in the earlier programs of the SAC – despite being demarcated into jazz, experimental music, and film, it was often the case that films would accompany the jazz performances, or that composers would contribute scores to the films. In this way, the SAC is often considered to be a place where the boundaries between genres dissolved through collaboration.

=== Influence on intermedia art ===
The multimedia stage experiments at the SAC arguably helped give birth to so-called intermedia art in the late 1960s. Intermedia experiments of the late 1960s pushed beyond collaborations across artistic genres - they used multiple genres (and often integrated new technologies) to create projects that interrogated broad shifts occurring in Japanese environment, culture, and institutions. Several key early experiments in intermedia actually took place at the SAC - for example, the performance tied to the exhibition From Space to Environment in 1966 involved an intermedia apparatus built from sound and light systems.

== Notable events ==
=== "Works of Yoko Ono" (1962) ===
The SAC is often regarded as the birthplace of the happening in Japan. At Yoko Ono's recital in 1962, she debuted several pieces, which were some of the first and most noteworthy artistic happenings in Japan. In each work, she instructed a group of performers, primarily artists affiliated with the SAC, to fulfill various actions. In The Pulse, the group performed mundane acts such as eating fruit and breaking objects. The recital concluded with a piece in which every performer stood on stage, and stared at a person in the audience until they established eye contact. Once they established eye contact, they selected a different person in the audience. If the performers grew tired, they could sit down or even lie down on stage. The event ended once there was no one left in the audience. An unidentified reviewer of Ono's performance defined the happening as "not an art that has already been completed, but an art form that enables the audience to receive something by witnessing the unfolding of nonsense acts, experiencing the process together with the performers."

However, artists such as Genpei Akasegawa have noted that even before Yoko Ono's recital, for several years the activities of the Neo-Dada Organizers had already resonated with the "happening." He recalled: "I obviously had the same awareness, even as part of Neo-Dada, you could say it was the instinct of the times, we just wanted to create actions. For me, it was about ceremonial events. We didn't have the word for 'happening' yet, so we were calling it something like a ceremony [gishiki]." As much as the SAC introduced new concepts to the Japanese avant-garde, the center was equally a meeting point for like-minded ideas that had been developing both in Japan and elsewhere.

=== "Performance by John Cage and David Tudor," "John Cage and David Tudor Event" (1962) ===
John Cage and David Tudor were invited to Japan and stayed for six weeks at the end of 1962. Although Toshiro Mayuzumi, Toshi Ichiyanagi and Yoko Ono, who had collaborated with John Cage while living in New York were instrumental, it was Hiroshi Teshigahara who was responsible for bringing Cage to Japan. Hiroshi stated, "The event I organized with John Cage and David Tudor created a sensation, called the “John Cage Shock,” and Jean Erdman's “Six People in a Carriage” caused quite a storm in Japan for being the first of its kind performed there (I remember Kobo Abe was very enthusiastic about it)." On his 1962 visit, Cage performed Theater piece and also premiered 0'00, dedicated to Toshi Ichiyanagi and Yoko Ono, at the SAC. In the former piece, he cooked, read a book, and moved around onstage as he would do in his everyday life, but with the sound of his actions amplified and delivered to the audience through a number of speakers. In 0'00, Cage amplified the subtle noise of writing out a score while smoking from time to time. After forty minutes of this action, he descended into the auditorium to receive a kiss from Yoko Ono (who was married to Ichiyanagi at the time), which indicated the end of the performance. These performances brought about what is now remembered as "John Cage shock" among contemporary musicians in Japan.

However, by understanding the meeting of the "happening" and Japanese avant-garde practices of "ceremony" at the SAC, this idea of "John Cage shock" can be debated: the degree of direct influence of Cage's performances is debatable, especially when similar experimentation had already been happening in Japan. These nuances are notably expressed by Yasunao Tone, who put forward the fact that these performances did not constitute a shock but were accepted rather easily. The music critic Hewell Tircuit wrote an article for The Japan Times highlighting the fact that several Japanese artists were already experimenting with processes similar to those that Cage had exhibited. This is the case of Group Ongaku, of which Yasunao Tone was a member, who played a concert at the SAC in 1961. The group used a variety of "instruments" including everyday objects (vacuum cleaner, dishes, washboard...), in a methodology of improvisation described as automatism. They gave their concert in front of a full house (with a capacity of 400 people) and their performance was covered by the major newspapers Mainichi and Asahi Shimbun.

=== "Twenty Questions to Bob Rauschenberg" (1964) ===
In November 1964, Merce Cunningham, John Cage, Steve Paxton, Deborah Hay and Robert Rauschenberg were also able to visit Japan thanks to the Sōgetsu Art Center, as part of a world tour of the Merce Cunningham Dance Compagny, which ended in Tokyo. Robert Rauschenberg participated in a US-Japan dance exchange workshop, arranged by Kuniharu Akiyama, that took place at the SAC on November 20, 1964. American participants were Robert Rauschenberg, Steve Paxton, Deborah Hay, and Barbara Lloyd, while Japanese participants included dancers and performers such as Tatsumi Hijikata, Takehisa Kosugi, and Mariko Sanjo.

On November 28, 1964, Robert Rauschenberg participated in the event "Twenty Questions to Bob Rauschenberg". The event was originally planned by the art critic Yoshiaki Tōno as a discussion between Rauschenberg and members of the Tokyo art community, including himself, Nobuaki Kojima, and Ushio Shinohara. However, instead of answering the questions of his Japanese interviewers, however, Rauschenberg spent the lecture time silently creating a Combine, entitled Gold Standard. He, with Alex Hay as his main assistant and help from Deborah Hay and Steve Paxton, painted and placed objects (barrier from a construction site, image of a clock, Coca-Cola bottles, tie painted gold, a worn-out pair of black leather shoes...) on a gold Japanese folding screen (byōbu), offered by Sōfū Teshigahara. The performance lasted more than four hours until the piece was finished, and most of the audience - including John Cage and Merce Cunningham - had already left, which was the trigger for the departure of Steve Paxton, Barbara Lloyd, Deborah Hay and Robert Rauschenberg from the company.

This performance is considered a legendary incident in the history of postwar Japanese art, an exemplary case of cross-cultural interaction. When Yoshiaki Tōno invited Nobuaki Kojima and Ushio Shinohara to come to the stage to ask their questions to Robert Rauschenberg, the two artists brought onto stage their own works - Shinohara's Marcel Duchamp Thinking (Shiko suru Maruseru Dyushan, 1963) and Coca-Cola Plan (1964), Kojiya's Figure (1964) holding a placard that said "Question." Ushio Shinohara read out his questions, in both Japanese and English, to which Robert Rauschenberg did not respond. The Japanese artist, frustrated, placed the sheet of paper containing the question under Rauschenberg's foot, which finally paid attention to the question, and then pasted the sheet onto the panel of the gold screen. This tense interaction between Rauschenberg and Shinohara, in addition to the presence on stage of works explicitly evoking the works of the star artist, recently awarded at the 1964 Venice Biennale (Coca-Cola Plan) and broadly in the United States (Figure), is indicative of the imbalance of cultural and financial power between American and Japanese artists at the time.

== Chronology of selected events ==
- August 30, 1958: First screening of Cinema 58, a continuation of Hiroshi Teshigahara and Susumu Hani’s screening group Cinema 57. The inaugural screening is a selection of films by Surrealist filmmaker Luis Buñuel.
- October 15, 1958: Kōbō Abe produces Sōgetsu-Kyōyō Club (Sōgetsu Culture Club), which focuses on meeting to discuss cinema and art in general. It proves to be a fertile ground for the birth of Fluxus. The club meets eight times, until July 1959.
- January 26, 1959: First screening of Cinema 59, a continuation of Teshigahara Hiroshi and Hani Susumu’s screening group Cinema 57. The inaugural screening included Mansaku Itami’s film Akanishi Kakita (1936).
- November 14, 1959: Launch of Modan Jazu no Kai (Modern Jazz Group), thereafter renamed Etosetora to Jazu no Kai (Etcetera and Jazz Group), which performed monthly until October 1960.
- December 3, 1959: Lecture by Michel Tapié.
- January 28, 1960: First performance of Sōgetsu Music Inn, a jazz program, which continued until the end of 1962.
- March 20, 1960: The SAC begins publishing SAC, renamed SAC Journal from No.14. The journal will stop being published in 1964.
- March 31, 1960: First performance in the Sōgetsu Contemporary Series, showcasing avant-garde classical music. The program continued until the end of 1963.
- April 22, 1961: "Modern Music by 4 American Composers" features the music of Henry Cowell, Charles Ives, Elliott Carter, and Andrew Imbrie.
- July 21, 1961: Inauguration of the film screening program Sōgetsu Cinemathèque. The program continues until March 1971, shortly before the SAC ceases operations.
- September 15, 1961: Group Ongaku (Shukō Mizuno, Yasunao Tone, Takehisa Kosugi, Mieko Shiomi and others) presented their first and last concert, Concert of Improvisational Music and Acoustic Objects (Sokkyō ongaku to onkyō obuje no konsato).
- November 30, 1961: Toshi Ichiyanagi returned to Tokyo from New York, and performed as part of the Sōgetsu Contemporary Series.
- June 3–4, 1961: Dance recital performed by Akiko Motofuji.
- June 15, 1961: Performance of works by playwright Tetsuji Takechi.
- December 19–20, 1961: Animeshon Sannin no Kai ("Association of Three Animators") screens works as part of Sōgetsu Cinemathèque.
- February 23, 1962: Piano recital by composer Yūji Takahashi.
- May 24, 1962: Yoko Ono organized a collaborative performance at the SAC, working with over 30 avant-garde artists.
- October 12 and October 23–24, 1962: John Cage and David Tudor events (for details see above).
- February 20–26, 1963: The exhibition "Bauhaus 1919-1933" opens at SAC and is accompanied by related lectures and performances.
- October 28, 1963: Recital of modern dance performed by Ayako Uchiyama.
- February 8, 1964: Hiroshi Teshigahara screens his film Suna no Onna (Woman in the Dunes), which would go on to win the Special Jury Prize at the Cannes Film Festival.
- May 29, 1964: Nam June Paik takes advantage of the center's support to discover Japan, and performs Hommage à John Cage, Etude for Piano, (La Monte Young's) To Flynt and Simple at the SAC.
- July 28, 1964: Evening performance by Suzushi Hanayagi.
- September 21–26, 1964: Inauguration of the Sōgetsu Animation Festival, held annually from 1964 to 1966, following the screenings organized at the center in the early 1960s by the Association of Three Animators (Hiroshi Manabe, Ryōkei Yanagihara, and Yōji Kuri). Osamu Tezuka presented Memory (めもりい) and mermaid (人魚) and Tadanori Yokoo presented Kiss kiss kiss.
- November 10–11, November 24–25, 1964: Merce Cunningham Dance Company performs at Sankei Hall in Tokyo. A modern dance workshop is offered at SAC on November 20.
- November 28, 1964: The event "Questions to Bob Rauschenberg" takes place (see above for details).
- March 1965: The SAC hosts a series of screenings of films by Toho Co., Ltd.
- July 14–15, 1965: The SAC hosts a Mime Festival.
- February 1–14, 1966: The Sōgetsu Cinemathèque invites Henri Langlois, founder of the Cinémathèque française in 1936, to curate the International Avant-Garde Film Festival, which presented historical and experimental films from around the world and influenced many artists in Japan.
- November 14, 1966: A performance takes place related to the From Space to Environment exhibition, including happenings and intermedia experiments staged by Ay-O, Toru Takemitsu, Katsuhiro Yamaguchi, Mieko Shimo, Toshi Ichiyanagi, and others.
- March 1967: The SAC launches the Underground Film Festival. The festival travels to Osaka, Kyoto, and Nagoya.
- April 18–20, 1967: The SAC hosts the play The Hunchback of Aomori, a debut performance by the avant-garde theater group Tenjō Sajiki.
- May 22–25, 1967: Performance by Jōkyō Gekijō, featuring works such as "John Silver."
- August 1967: A symposium is organized on freedom of expression, in relation of Unfreedom of Expression, an exhibition organized at the Marumatsu Gallery, Tokyo, to support Genpei Akasegawa with his infamous 1,000 Yen Note Trial.
- November 7–25, 1967: The first Sōgetsu Experimental Film Festival debuts.
- April 10–30 and July 17–19, 1968: Expose 1968: Nanika itte kure, ima sagasu ("Expose 1968: Say Something Now, I’m Looking for Something to Say") was a multimedia symposium, with stage design by Tadanori Yokoo. Several Tokyo Pop-related artists and critics participated in panel discussions and stage performances. Kiyoshi Awazu designed the poster and ticket for the symposium.
- October 18–30, 1968: Film Art Festival Tokyo 68 includes a variety of underground and experimental films. The festival tours and screens in several locations around Japan.
- December 20, 1968: Intermedia Art Festival
- February 13–14, 1969: Stan Vanderbeek visits Japan and performs "Expanded Cinema" at the SAC.
- October 16, 1969: A "fake revolt" carried out by members of Suginami Film Club, Newsreel, as well as filmmaker Kenji Kanesaka, drives the cancellation of the 1969 Film Art Festival.

== Key sources ==
- 編集芦屋市立美術博物館, 千葉市美術館 『草月とその時代 1945–1970』草月とその時代展実行委員会, 1998.
- 草月アートセンターの記録刊行委員会『輝け60年代: 草月アートセンターの全記錄』「草月アートセンターの記錄」刊行委員会, フィルムアート社, 2002.
- 文化の仕掛人 -『現代文化の磁場と透視図』 - 秋山邦晴 他 著, 1985
