= From Space to Environment =

1966 art exhibition in Tokyo

From Space to Environment (Japanese: 「空間から環境へ」展, Hepburn: Kūkan kara kankyō e) was a postwar Japanese exhibition of contemporary art and design that was held on the eighth floor gallery of the Matsuya Department Store in Ginza, Tokyo, from November 11–16, 1966. It was organised by the multidisciplinary group Environment Society (Embairamento no Kai) to promoted the marriage of art and technology.

The exhibition's subtitle was “Synthesized Exhibition of Painting + Sculpture + Photo + Design + Architecture + Music,” indicating its goal of erasing conventional distinctions between fine and applied arts, and it was instrumental in introducing the terms "Intermedia" and "Environment Art" (kankyō geijutsu) to Japan. It featured 38 participants from a range of creative disciplines, including artists, architects, designers, and art critics. A related performance concert took place on November 14, 1966, at the Sōgetsu Art Center (SAC) (Japanese: 草月アートセンター) in Tokyo. The show encompassed architecture, environment art, installation art, visual art, and design.

== Exhibition concept ==
Environment Society formed around the goal of challenging institutional art structures by working collaboratively while abandoning traditional genre distinctions. This goal is made clear in the text outlining their objectives for From Space to Environment in the Bijutsu Techō issue that served as a quasi-catalogue for the exhibition. Specifically, they state:

It seems that various artistic genres today are going through a phase of intense self-destruction. There is no need to do anything further if it suffices to remain comfortably ensconced in existing arts, techniques, or dogma, pandering to conventional notions of art held by viewers and audiences...Instead, must we not focus on the chaotic site where each genre, tending toward radical self-destruction, necessarily intermingles and collides with others?

One further goal was to activate the position of the viewer in relation to the artwork. The statement of objectives described this as forcing active involvement:

in the space that the work generates, as it engulfs them and demands participation. In other words, the static, harmonious relationship between the viewer and the work of art has been broken, and the notion of the site has shifted from a conventional "space" toward a dynamic and chaotic "environment" that includes the viewers and the artworks.

== Exhibition description and notable works ==
From Space to Environment was imagined as an explicitly interdisciplinary exhibition and thus included participants from a range of creative disciplines. In total thirty-eight artists participated in the show (see list of exhibited artists below), but the core group leading the exhibition were visual artist Katsuhiro Yamaguchi, architect Arata Isozaki, designers Kiyoshi Awazu and Shin’ya Izumi, art critics Shūzō Takiguchi, Yoshiaki Tōnō, and Yūsuke Nakahara. Artists participated with a range of paintings, sculptures, installations, posters, and performances, that emphasized interaction between the viewer and the art as well as between the works themselves.

Overall the exhibition design attempted to minimize architectural structures, such as walls, between artworks so that the works would visually interact with each other. However the exhibition was divided into a lit section and a darkened corridor that featured more self-contained works. Notable works in the exhibition included Takamatsu Jirō's Chairs and Table in Perspective (遠近法の椅子とテーブル, 1966), a sculptural set of chairs and table overlaid with a grid that are formed in extreme forced perspective, with the chairs near the front of the sculpture literally larger than those at the back; Arata Isozaki's boldly-colored sculptural maquette for Fukuoka Sōgo Bank (建築空間(福岡相互銀行大分支店), 1966) suspended on the wall; a site-specific installation on the wall of Ay-O's Finger Boxes (フィンガー・ボックス, 1963–66), which invite viewers to insert their fingers to experience different tactile sensations; photographer Shōmei Tōmatsu's No. 24 (1966), an installation that invited viewers to place their feet on footprints to stand within an off-kilter enclosing white space; and Yamaguchi's Port (港, 1966), a set of larger-than-human sized colored transparent acrylic J-shapes and cubes, positioned in different arrangements with lights inside that was shown again at the Solomon R. Guggenheim Museum in 1967. A number of works included mobile elements, such as industrial designer Hiroshi Tomura's spiral-shaped mobile sculptures made out of thin plastic that hung from the ceiling, Shintarō Tanaka's delicately balanced arching Heart Mobile (ハートのモビール, 1966), Takamichi Itō's noise-making viewer-rotated cylinders, and a display of sliding posters, that viewers could manipulate, by designers Kazumasa Nagai, Ikkō Tanaka, and Tadanori Yokoo. Other works featured reflective surfaces, such as designer Awazu's stainless water basin that reflected the surrounding sculptures and visitors against text characters inside the basin, Shin’ya Izumi's sculpture of stacked glass bottles, and Minami Tada's Compose (1966), a set of reflective acrylic concave half-spheres set into boxes at eye level.

== Recent critical positioning of the show ==
Realized in November 1966, a little over one year after the announcement that Osaka would host the Expo 70 and including a number of artists and designers who would become involved in pavilions for the expo in Osaka, this exhibition is widely considered to mark the start of artistic preparations for Expo 70. However, it also occurred a mere five months after the Primary Structures exhibition in New York, and the Bijutsu Techō issue devoted to covering the exhibition included images from Primary Structures, so the use of industrial materials and fabrication processes, color and space, and larger-than-human scale sculptural elements and environments have also been understood as a response and challenge to the emerging movement of Minimalism in the US.

While From Space to Environment is generally recognized as a landmark exhibition in postwar Japanese art, its exact meaning and implications are still under debate. In a seminal analysis of the politics of Expo 70 that reads the exposition as a consolidation of authoritarian political, economic, and cultural power and a revival of wartime rhetoric, art critic Noi Sawaragi positions the concept of environment (kankyō) espoused in From Space to Environment as a crucial step in the move toward Expo 70's totalizing artistic vision. Sawaragi argues that this totalizing vision, allied with what he characterizes as an optimistic view of the possibilities of artistic collaborations with technology, uncritically and unwittingly sets the stage for avant-garde art to disempower visitors in an overwhelming spectacle that serves to legitimize an increasingly authoritarian state. Art historian Midori Yoshimoto challenges this reading by analyzing a number of artworks in the exhibition from the standpoint of their focus on interactivity and performativity, and by further surveying the critical responses at the time to reveal a consistent recognition of the desire to interact that these works evoked. She argues that this approach, combined with the focus on American precedents in Environment Society's own positioning of the exhibition, favor an understanding of their goals as rooted in an international artistic dialogue that looked to precedents set by Pop Art and Fluxus, resonating with contemporaneous movements like Op Art and kinetic art. Architectural historian Yasutaka Tsuji further critiques Sawaragi's argument by comparing the Japan Design Committee's (JDC) understanding of technology with that of Environment Society, inspired by the historical fact that From Space to Environment and the JDC's annual Good Design exhibition were held concurrently on the eight floor of the Matsuya Department Store in Ginza. Tsuji understands the JDC's view of technology and industrial mass production as positivist, focused on the benefits it can bring to daily life, but points out that in contrast, Environment Society's approach to technology is more ambivalent, with interactivity in relation to technology foregrounded in order to give the visitor agency against the pre-designated uses of technology. Art historian Ken Yoshida, who considers the exhibition within Isozaki's larger oeuvre, reads the exhibition as a decentering of human perception through the way in which the surface effects of the often reflective and printed materials used in many of the works tend not to reveal their material reality, emphasizing "the disjunction of perception and matter." Yoshida thus reads the show as concerned with a negotiation of competing symbolic and physical perceptions of urban space, and aligned with a politics that seeks to destabilize identity rather than dictating an authorized perspective or identity on viewers.

== List of exhibited artists ==
This list is based on the exhibition plan published in the Bijutsu Techō issue that served as a quasi-catalogue for From Space to Environment.

- アイオー or 靉嘔 AY-O (1931)
- 秋山 邦春, Kuniharu Akiyama (1931–1962)
- 粟津 潔, Kiyoshi Awazu (1929–2009)
- 泉 真也, Shinya Izumi (1929)
- 磯崎 新, Arata Isozaki (1931)
- 一柳 慧, Toshi Ichiyanagi (1933)
- 伊藤 隆道, Takamichi Itō (1939)
- 伊原 道夫, Michio Ihara (1928)
- 今井 祝雄, Norio Imai (1946)
- 榎本 建規, Takemi Enomoto (1935)
- 大辻 清司, Kiyoshi Ōtsuji (1923)
- 勝井 三雄, Mitsuo Katsui (1931)
- 聽濤 襄治, Jōji Kikunami (1923)
- 木村 恒久, Tsunehisa Kimura (1928–2008)
- 小橋 泰秀, Yasuhide Kobashi (1931–2003)
- 坂本 正治, Masaharu Sakamoto (1938)
- 高松 次郎, Jiro Takamatsu (1936–1998)
- 滝口 修造, Shūzō Takiguchi, (1903–1979)
- 多田 美波, Minami Tada (1924–2014)
- 田中 一光, Ikko Tanaka, (1930–2002)
- 田中 信太郎, Shintaro Tanaka (1940)
- 田中 不二, Fuji Tanaka (1930)
- 東野 芳明, Yoshiki Tonogai (1930–2005)
- 東松 照明, Shōmei Tōmatsu (1930)
- 戸村 浩, Hiroshi Tomura (1938)
- 永井 一正, Kazumasa Nagai (1929)
- 中原 祐介, Yūsuke Nakahara (1931)
- 奈良原 一高, Ikkō Narahara (1931–2020)
- 原 広司, Hiroshi Hara (1936)
- 福田 繁雄, Shigeo Fukuda (1932–2009)
- 松田 豊, Yutaka Matsuda (1942–1998)
- 三木 冨雄, Tomio Miki (1938–1978)
- 宮脇 愛子, Aiko Miyawaki, (1929–2014)
- 山口 勝弘, Katsuhiro Yamaguchi (1928)
- 横尾 忠則, Tadanori Yokoo (1936)
- 横須賀 功光, Noriaki Yokosuka (1937–2003)
- 吉村 益信, Masunobu Yoshimura (1932–2011)
