= Teshigahara =

Teshigahara (written: 勅使河原) is a Japanese surname. Notable people with the surname include:

- Hiroshi Teshigahara (勅使河原 宏, 1927–2001), Japanese film director
- Sōfu Teshigahara (勅使河原 蒼風, 1900–1979), Japanese flower arranger
