= Kōhei Sugiura =

Japanese graphic designer (born 1932)

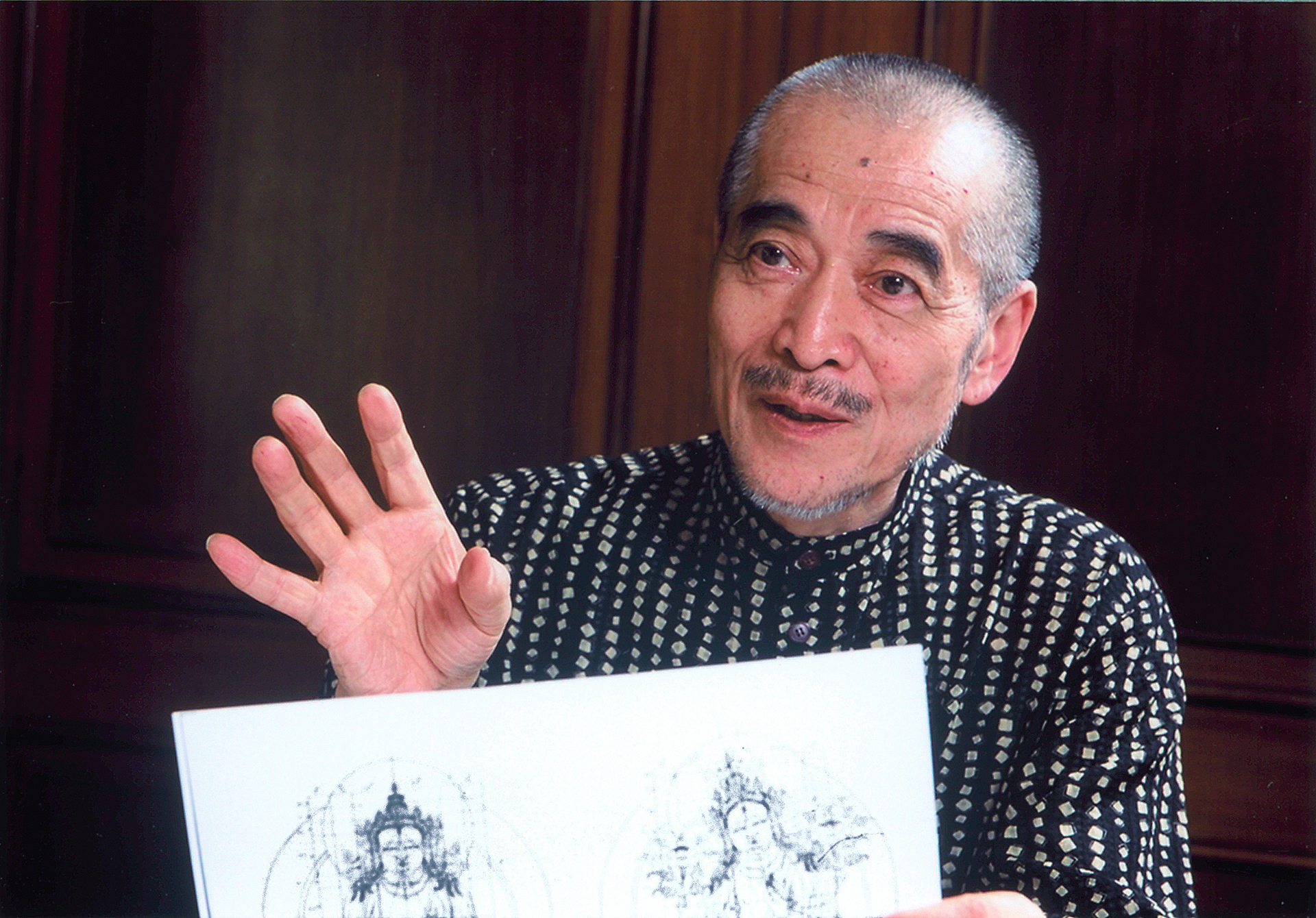
Kohei Sugiura, 2003.

Kōhei Sugiura (杉浦 康平, Sugiura Kōhei; b. September 8, 1932, Tokyo) is a Japanese graphic designer and researcher in Asian iconography.

Throughout his career, Sugiura has been a pioneer within the design world using processes that enable the visualization of consciousness in his large body of work that ranges from record jackets and posters, to books, magazines, and exhibition catalogues, to diagrams, stamps, and more. He is also active in promoting the study of traditional Asian cultures through producing innovative catalogue designs and organizing exhibitions such as Mandala: now you see it, now you don't (1980) and Flower Cosmology: Traditions in Dyeing, Weaving, and Ornaments (1992), underscored by his prolific research on cosmologies and mandalas.

Sugiura served as a visiting professor for the Ulm School of Design in Germany (1964–1967); professor at Kobe Design University (1987–2002); and, since April 2010, is the director of the Asian Design Institute at Kobe Design University. He has received numerous awards, including the Mainichi Industrial Award (1962), Mainichi Art Award (1997); Purple Ribbon (1997); Leipzig Book Design Competition Special Honor Award; Design Special Achievement Award by the Hong Kong Design Award Asia (2014); Order of the Rising Sun, Gold Rays (2019).

== Education and career ==
Sugiura studied architecture at the Tokyo National University of the Arts. He developed an interest in design as a university student and after graduating in 1955, he worked under the designer Ryūichi Yamashiro at Takashimaya Department Store's advertising department for six months. The following year, Sugiura received the Nisshenbi (日宣美, JAAC) Award for his jacket design for of the record LP JACKET and began to receive attention in the graphic-design world as a rising talent with an atypical architecture background.

From a young age, Sugiura loved music and was knowledgeable in folk music and contemporary music. Early in his career, Sugiura took on various music-related design jobs, including the newly founded Sogetsu Art Center. For Sogetsu, he worked with other designers Tadanori Yokoo, Kiyoshi Awazu, and Makoto Wada to create materials promoting music-related events for contemporary artists and musicians, including composers John Cage and David Tudor.

Sugiura began his career in the late 1950s when advertising dominated the majority of design work, as was suggested by the term "commercial design" (商業デザイン) having come into conventional use. In response, Sugiura, along with a bourgeoning generation of artists in their late 20s, sought to devise a mode of visual design that took inspiration from a wide frame of references, including science, philosophy, and religion, as well as other artistic mediums.

Suigura took on a leadership role for this group of young designers, bringing Japan's existing design climate into a modern era. Some of his best examples include his numerous book designs as well as his inventive diagrams (also known as infographics), such as his series of Time Distance Maps. His work on "maps" served as an important step in establishing diagrams and infographics as part of visual communication and design in Japan.

== Magazines ==
Over the course of his career, Sugiura has worked as a designer on nearly forty different magazines, ranging from academic periodicals to novel cultural publications and some with run times as long as two or three decades.

=== Early magazines (1960s) ===
When Sugiura moved to freelance work in the late 1950s, most magazines and particularly academic magazines, were designed by editors who often had little design experience. Sugiura was among the first to introduce an artistic-yet-methodical approach to the field of academic-magazine design. His designs from this period are characterized by his process of first determining an origin pattern and reworking the pattern in various orientations and color arrangements. He described this method as jikozōshoku dezain (自己増殖デザイン; self-proliferation design). As these types of magazines often had a limited design budget, Sugiura's method saved costs by repurposing printing plates which would typically be discarded or retired after the original design had been printed.

Sugiura attributes the realization of self-proliferation design to his work on one of his earliest magazines, Ongaku geijutsu (音楽芸術, "art of music") (1960–1963), the only Japanese magazine at the time that was dedicated to academic research on contemporary music. For the cover, he created an original pattern based on the sequence of composer Olivier Messiaen's mode de valuers et d'intensités and micro sequences from the twelve-tone technique of musical composition.

Over the next two years, subsequent covers were derivatives of the same pattern, composed through slight deviations in the sequences combined with variations in the colors and number of colors. Magazines Kōhoku (広告, "advertising") (1960); Kōgei nyūsu (工芸ニュース, "industrial art news"), Sūgaku seminā (数学セミナー, "mathematics semina")（第1期）1962–1970, and Shin Nhon bungaku (新日本文学, "new Japanese literature") (1964–1966) also featured covers conceived through the mechanics of self-proliferation design.

Using the self-proliferation method, Sugiura also realized a series of "vibrating" designs that he would incorporate into music-based projects, including the record jacket of Experimental Music of Japan '69 (日本の電子音楽 '69 "electronic music of Japan '69") and Masakazu Nakai zenshū (中井正一全集 ) (1981). These designs also originated from his cover work for Ongaku geijutsu, in 1963, when Sugiura replaced the original pattern with one that was formed primarily through concentric circles. Through the overlaying, crossing, and cropping of concentric circles and other geometric shapes, Sugiura felt he had developed a design that could capture a sense of movement or rhythm and act as a visual embodiment of acoustics and noise.

=== Shift from pattern to content (late-1960s onwards) ===
After teaching at the Ulm School of Design, Sugiura's design philosophy underwent a significant shift, inspired by the consciousness of civil society within German design practices and the role of design as method of visual communication. For his magazine covers, Sugiura moved away from purely decorative patterns and towards a more content focused approach wherein he would form a unique "face" and visual identity for the magazine.

In the case of architectural magazines such as SD (1966–1968) and the Toshi-Jutaku (都会住宅, "the monthly journal of urban housing") (1968–1970), Sugiura opted for covers that were unprecedentedly text heavy in an attempt to appeal to the reader-base of architects (whom he felt were more concerned with verbal and textual expression/communication versus visual). While most architecture-magazine covers at the time featured a single enlarged photograph, Sugiura opted for dense and compositionally complex covers because he felt the simplicity of a single image could not properly convey the multiplicity of thoughts present in postmodern urban society.

Sugiura also began experimenting with novel designs that featured uncommon text orientations and printing materials. For the philosophy magazine Paideia (パイデイア) (1969–1972), he formulated his own design grid that is based on eight-point type, making it one of the first 20th-century Japanese magazines to forgo the Japanese metric system or shakkanhō. Sugiura also chose unconventional paper colors, such as green and light purple, and ink colors for the text.

For the magazine Asian Culture (1972–1987), later renamed to APC (Asian Pacific Culture) (1988–1995), he refrained from using any white or black paper, and instead chose to print onto bright craft paper with vividly colored inks to create an electric duo-chrome style that would convey the vitality he saw in Asian culture.

Sugiura's longest-running involvement with a single publication, Ginka (季刊銀花, "quarterly silver flower") (1970–2010) underwent a new design schemata every year based on a unique theme. With Ginka, Sugiura played with a dynamic and constantly changing arrangement of text and images, numerous type faces, and hand-drawn calligraphy. One of the most well-known themes from Ginka was in the year 1983 for which all the layouts were angled in line with the tilt of the Earth's axis.

Sugiura's dedication to explorative design is also evidenced in the experimental and cross-disciplinary publications Uwasa no Shinsō (噂の眞相, "truth of rumor") (1980–2004) and Yu (遊, "play") (1971–1979). Uwasa no Shinsō, a unique magazine that investigated various contemporary and historical rumors, underwent a design change every three issues. Sugiura selected new artists every year and assigned them a theme, similar to Ginka – however, the constant stylistic evolution of Uwasa no Shinsō was an intentional choice to emulate the temporality and elusiveness of rumors. On the covers, images and text were often overlapped and partially covering one another, thereby creating a sense of movement and secrecy that spoke to the nature of rumors. Yu, a self-proclaimed "anti-literature/ non literature" magazine that paired the work of scientists and artists, took on a design style that echoed the content's radical sense of play. Sugiura explorations with Yu included dizzying spreads with text blocks that intersected each other from various angles (1975, V. 8), combined faces of the couples featured in the magazine (1976, V. 9), and issue titles printed on the spine made from the initials of the people within the magazine (1976, V. 10).

== Books ==
Sugiura's venture into book design began in the early 1960s when he was brought on as a designer for Document 1961, a book published by Japan Council against A & H Bombs, which included photographs by Ken Domon and Shōmei Tōmatsu. His involvement in photobooks grew significantly from the late 1960s to 1980s, during which Sugiura worked with photographers based both in and outside of Japan, including Eikoh Hosoe, Ikko Nakahara, Yutaka Takanashi, and Robert Frank. At a time when photobooks were generally regarded as a reproduction of original images, Sugiura's approach to book design was notable in that the photobook itself was meant to be considered its own original work. Through the medium of a book with its own unique materials, printing techniques, methods of physical engagement, and three dimensionality, Sugiura sought out a sense of materiality and active viewing experience that operated as a separate entity from stand-alone photography prints.

Sugiura's design for Kikuji Kawada's The Map (地図) (1965) propelled his reputation as a formidable book designer among Japanese art critics and continues to be regarded as a seminal work in the history of photobooks. Given that Kawada photographs include images of the war's aftermath and shadow-like imprints burned into the walls of the Atomic Bomb Dome, Sugiura wanted to design a book that would necessitate longer and more intimate interactions with the book. The Map features a book of Kawada's work, a brown insert of text by Kenzaburo Ōe, and a two-part slipcase. When the exterior part of the slipcase is removed, the interior part encases the book with two sets of doors (a panel on each edge of the book). When all four panels, the reader can see have words, related to images' content, printed in a list wrapping around the circumference of the book – though the orientation of the text would require one to rotate the entire case in order to read it. Within the photobook, each page is folded so that a single spread contains outer image and hidden inner images, once again requiring greater physically engagement than a standard book. Sugiura joined the folded pages through an uncommon binding process that relied solely on glue.

Sugiura's play with the notion of materiality is seen in other photobooks like Yutaka Takanashi's To the City (都市へ) (1974) for which a large moon-like aluminum circle is placed on top of the front cover but also extends to books in other genres, including the artist monograph Tetsumi Kudo (1969), in which small-scale figurines created by the artist are set within enclaves carved into the pages. Sugiura's emphasis of the medium's three dimensionality is evidenced further in his detailed use of every available surface within a book. In his all‐black book depicting the cosmos, Summa Cosmographica (1979), an image of either the Andromeda Galaxy or Flamsteed's chart of the constellations is revealed on trim edge depending on the tilt of the pages.

For the design of Tough Woman Like a Spinning Top (ぶっちんごまの女) (1985), a book about the Meiji courtesan grandmother of the author and painter Shinichi Saitō, features a landscape painting of the red-light district Yoshiwara that wraps around from the front end sheets, across the fore edge, and ending at the back end sheets. In the case of multivolume collections, such as the writings of Gottfried Wilhelm Leibniz (ライプニッツ著作集) (Kōsakusha, 1988–1999) or Louis-Ferdinand Céline (セリーヌの作品集) (Kokusho Kankōkai, 1978–2003), multiple images are printed on the spines so that the combined display of all the volumes doubles as a visual showcase of the writers.

== Asian design and iconography research ==
Sugiura's consciousness of Asia began as a child with his attraction to Asian folk music and grew during a his time teaching at Ulm, where he acquired a new-found self-awareness about Asian identity. However, Sugiura's preoccupation with the question of defining Asian design and iconography was informed by his trip to India in 1971 when he was sent under UNESCO Development Program in order to survey the state of Indian printing and create seminars on printing development in the country.

Sugiura then began producing and compiling research on ancient Asian cosmologies, calligraphic traditions, iconography, and general culture that spanned across the multiple countries within the Asian continent. The regional breadth of his research interests speak to one of the core tenets of his theories – many of the multilayered symbols and iconography of various Asian countries have shared origins that are independent from Western traditions.

Through the Asian Cultural Centre for UNESCO, Sugiura has published his research in the periodicals Asian Culture and APC. He has also produced book sets on these cosmologies, including The Mandalas of the Two Worlds (伝真言院両界曼荼羅) (1977) and Tibetan Mandalas – The Ngor Collection (西蔵曼荼羅集成：チベット・マンダラ) (1983). In addition to his role at the Asian Design Institute, Sugiura has presented lectures and participated in academic publications and exhibitions related to Asian design.

== Publications designed by Sugiura ==
=== Magazines ===
1960s	1970s	1980s – 2000s
音楽芸術 (1960–1963) 広告 (1960) 工芸ニュース [Industrial Arts News] 数学セミナー（第1期）1962–1970 [sugaku seminar] デザイン (1964) 新日日本文学 (1964–1966) [sin nihon bungaku/ nova japana literature] SD (1966–1968) [Space Design] 都会住宅 (1968–1970) [the TOSHI-JUTAKU] パイデイア (1969–1972) 法学セミナー (1964–2004) 朝日アジア・レビュー (1969–1978)	季刊銀花 (1970–2010) インセクタリュム (1970–2000) 数学セミナー （第2・3・4期）(1970–2004) a+u (1971) [Architecture and Urbanism] 遊 (1971–1979) objet magazine 日本の将来 (1971–1972) 労働法律旬報 (1972–) Asian Culture (1972–1987) エピステーメー（第1期）(1975–1979)	噂の眞相 (1980–2004) Uwasa no Shinso Dolmen (1989–1991) 自然と文化 (1983–2005) エピステーメー（第2期）(1984–1986) リブラリア (1988) 墨スペシャル (1989) 日本語 (1989–1990) 文 (1985–) 3セミ (1985–1991) APC (1988–1995) 高校のひろば (1991–1996) ひと (1999–2000) ポリティーク (2001–)

=== Books ===
- Kawada, Kikuji. 地図 = The Map. Tokyo: Bijutsu Shuppan-sha, 1965.
- Narahara, Ikko. ヨーロッパ・静止した時間 = Europe: Where Time Has Stopped. Tokyo: Kashima Kenkyujo Shupankan 1967.
- Haniya, Yukou. Black Horse in the Darkness. Tokyo: Kawadeshobo Shinsha, 1971.
- Takanashi, Yutaka. 都市へ = Towards the City. Izara Shobo (Yutaka Takanashi, Self-Published), 1974.
- Miyauchi, Yoshihisa et al., ed. The World of Isamu Kenmochi. Tokyo: Kawadeshobo Shinsha, 1975.
- Lithographs of Bayrle: City. UNAC Tokyo, 1977.
- 伝真言院両界曼荼羅 = The Mandalas of the Two Worlds. Photographs by Yasuhiro Ishimoto. Tokyo: Heibonsha, 1977.
- Matsuoka, Seigo, ed. 全宇宙誌 = Summa Cosmographica. Tokyo: Kousakusha, 1979.
- Narahara, Ikko. Portici di Luce: Piazza San Marco. UNAC Tokyo, 1981.
- Takahashi, Eiichi. Four Seasons of Hyotei. Tokyo: Shibata Shoten, 1982.
- Gyatso, Sonam. 西蔵曼荼羅集成：チベット・マンダラ= Tibetan Mandalas - The Ngor Collection. Tokyo: Kodansha, 1983.
- Hosoe, Eikoh. 薔薇刑 = Ordeal by Roses. New York: Aperture, 1985. Photographs of Yukio Mishima.
- Saito, Tadao, ed. 古凧の美 日本古凧絵四十選 = Beauty of Old Kites: Forty Selected Japanese Kite Paintings. Miraisha, 1987.
- Aida, Mitsuo. Thank You All. Tokyo: Diamond-sha, 1988.
- Unagami, Masaomi, ed. Collected Works of Teppei Ujiyama. Fukuoka: Nishinihon Shimbunsha, 1989.
- Nakamura, Makoto and Shigeo Fukuda. One Hundred Smiles of Mona Lisa. UNAC Tokyo, 2004.
- Publications about Sugiura's design
- Sugiura Kohei et al. 疾風迅雷—杉浦康平雑誌デザインの半世紀 = Wind and Lightning: A Half-Century of Magazine Design by Kohei Sugiura. Tokyo, DNP Graphic Design Archive. 2004.
- Luminous Mandala: Book Designs of Kohei Sugiura. Tokyo: Ginza Graphic Gallery, 2011.
- Sugiura Kohei et al. 杉浦康平・脈動する本——デザインの手法と哲学 = Vibrant Books: Methods and Philosophy of Kohei Sugiura's Design. Tokyo: Musashino Art University Museum and Library, 2010.
- Sugiura Kohei et al. 時間のヒダ、空間のシワ ... [時間地図]の試み：杉浦康平ダイアグラムコレクション = Experiments in "Time Distance Map": Diagram Collection by Kohei Sugiura. Toyo: Kajima Institute Publishing, 2014.
- (3 Volume Series) 杉浦康平デザインの言葉: 多主語的なアジア (2010); アジアの音・光・夢幻 (2011); 文字の霊力 (2014).

== Sources ==
- Kaneko, Ryuichi and Ivan Vartanian. 日本ん写真集史 1956–1986. Kyoto: Akaaka, 2009.
- Sugiura Kohei et al. 疾風迅雷–杉浦康平雑誌デザインの半世紀 = Wind and Lightning: A Half-Century of Magazine Design by Kohei Sugiura. Tokyo, DNP Graphic Design Archive. 2004.
- Sugiura, Kohei. The Way of Asian Design – Kohei Sugiura: Graphic Design Methodology and Philosophy. Edited by Kirti Trivedi. Mumbai: Asian Design and Art Research Group, 2015.
- Usuda, Shoji. 杉浦康平のデザイン. Tokyo: Heibonsha, 2010.
