= Grapefruit (book) =

1964 artist's book by Yoko Ono

Grapefruit, First Edition, 1964

Grapefruit is an artist's book written by Yoko Ono, originally published in 1964. It has become famous as an early example of conceptual art, containing a series of "event scores" that replace the physical work of art – the traditional stock-in-trade of artists – with instructions that an individual may, or may not, wish to enact.

Grapefruit is one of the monuments of conceptual art of the early 1960s. She has a lyrical, poetic dimension that sets her apart from the other conceptual artists. Her approach to art was only made acceptable when [people] like Kosuth and Weiner came in and did virtually the same thing as Yoko, but made them respectable and collectible.

— David Bourdon

== Origins of the event score ==
Event scores were developed by a number of artists attending John Cage's experimental music composition classes at the New School for Social Research in New York. Whilst Ono did not attend these informal lessons, her husband at the time, Toshi Ichiyanagi (an experimental musician), did, and Toshi and Ono became regulars of Cage's circle of friends by 1959. Other members of this group included David Tudor, Morton Feldman, Richard Maxfield and Merce Cunningham. Invention of the event score is usually credited to George Brecht, but La Monte Young and Yoko Ono are also cited as amongst the first to experiment with the form. Both Cage and Brecht were deeply influenced by "Oriental thinking", and Ono found that her Buddhist-inspired work was, almost accidentally, fêted by the emerging New York counterculture as avant-garde.

Event Scores involve simple actions, ideas, and objects from everyday life recontexualized as performance. Event Scores are texts that can be seen as proposal pieces or instructions for actions. The idea of the score suggests musicality. Like a musical score, Event Scores can be realized by artists other than the original creator and are open to variation and interpretation.

== Evolution of the book ==
Often considered a Fluxus artwork, the work was originally published by Ono's own imprint, Wunternaum Press, in Tokyo in an edition of 500. After leaving New York in 1962 – where she had exhibited at Maciunas' AG Gallery, amongst others – her then-husband, Anthony Cox, suggested she collect her scores together. George Maciunas, the central personality in Fluxus, had apparently been trying to reach her in Tokyo with the aim of printing a similar book in New York, as part of his series of Fluxkits (see Water Yam), but his letters had not reached her; she sent some of the scores and a prepublication advertisement to be published in his Fluxus newspaper in February 1964 when contact was finally established.

=== First edition ===
The name Grapefruit was chosen as the title because Ono believed the grapefruit to be a hybrid of an orange and a lemon, and thus a reflection of herself as "a spiritual hybrid."

The first edition that was published in 1964 in Japan by Wunternaum Press, created by Yoko Ono, contains over 150 "instruction works"; virtually all are in English, with about a third translated into Japanese. They are divided into five sections: Music, Painting, Event, Poetry and Object. The instructions are preceded by dedications to figures including John Cage, La Monte Young, Nam June Paik, Isamu Noguchi, and Peggy Guggenheim, and also include documentation relating to Ono's recent exhibitions and performances. The work was originally sold for $3.00 before publication, $6.00 after.

1964

- Wunternaum Press. Tokyo, Japan (Paperback)

=== Subsequent editions ===
The second edition was published in 1970 by Simon & Schuster in New York, Peter Owen Ltd in London, and Bärmeier & Nikel in Frankfurt. As well as an introduction by John Lennon ("Hi! My name is John Lennon. I'd like you to meet Yoko Ono ..." In the 2000 reissue of Lennon's 1964 book, In His Own Write, Ono wrote a similar introduction), the work contained 80 more instruction pieces, and included two more sections, Film and Dance. The book ends with a collection of Ono's writings, including To The Wesleyan People, 1966. Paperback editions were issued by Sphere and Touchstone around the same time, and a reprint by Simon & Schuster in 2000. The Sphere edition has a memorable sleeve, conflating the title with Yoko Ono's film Bottoms, (or no. 4), a film composed exclusively of naked bottoms, made in 1966.

1970

- Bärmeier & Nikel. Frankfurt am Main, Germany
- Peter Owen. London, UK
- Simon & Schuster. New York, USA (Hardcover with dust jacket)
- POMELO. Ediciones de la Flor. Buenos Aires, Argentina

1971

- Sphere Books. London, UK
- Simon & Schuster. New York, USA (Paperback)
- TouchStone Book, USA

2000

- Simon & Schuster. New York, USA
- Bakhåll. Sweden

2004

- PAMPLEMOUSSE. Textuel. France

2005

- GRAPEFRUIT. INSTRUZIONE PER L'ARTE E PER LA VITA. Mondadori. Italy

2006

- POMELO. Centro de Creación Experimental. Cuenca, Spain

2015

- Museum of Modern Art. New York, USA. (Facsimile of first edition in slip case.)

== Some of the scores ==
PIECES FOR ORCHESTRA

No.1

Peel

No.2

Peek

No.3

Take off

— 1962 Summer

COUGH PIECE

Keep coughing a year.

— 1961 Winter

CLOUD PIECE

Imagine the clouds dripping.
Dig a hole in your garden to
put them in.

— 1963 Spring

=== Painting to exist only when it's copied or photographed ===
Let people copy or photograph your paintings. Destroy the original.

— 1964 Spring

=== Painting to be constructed in your head ===
Go on transforming a square canvas
in your head until it becomes a
circle. Pick out any shape in the
process and pin up or place on the
canvas an object, a smell, a sound
or a colour that came to your mind
in association with the shape.

— 1962 Spring
Sogetsu

=== SHOOT 100 PANES OF GLASS ===
When a person hurts you badly,
line up 100 panes of glass in
the field and shoot a bullet
through it.
Take a copy of a map made by
the cracks on each glass and
send a map a day for 100 days
to the person who has hurt you.

— 1966 Fall

=== SNOW PIECE ===
Think that snow is falling. Think that snow is falling
everywhere all the time. When you talk with a person, think
that snow is falling between you and on the person.
Stop conversing when you think the person is covered by snow.

— 1963

=== Tunafish sandwich piece ===
Imagine one thousand suns in the
sky at the same time.
Let them shine for one hour.
Then, let them gradually melt
into the sky.
Make one tunafish sandwich and eat.

— 1964 Spring

=== Painting to be stepped on ===
Leave a piece of canvas or finished
painting on the floor or in the street.

— 1960 winter

== Influence on "Imagine" ==
Several poems from Grapefruit inspired Lennon while writing the lyrics for "Imagine" in 1971; in particular, "Cloud Piece" which Capitol Records reproduced on the back cover of the original Imagine LP, reading: "Imagine the clouds dripping, dig a hole in your garden to put them in." Shortly before his death, Lennon said the composition "should be credited as a Lennon/Ono song. A lot of it—the lyric and the concept—came from Yoko, but in those days I was a bit more selfish, a bit more macho, and I sort of omitted her contribution, but it was right out of Grapefruit, her book. There's a whole pile of pieces about ‘Imagine this’ and ‘Imagine that’." In 2017, Yoko Ono received a co-writing credit.

== Sequel ==
Initially a sequel, Grapefruit II, was planned. It is mentioned once in Grapefruit and had a pre-publication price of $5 and a post-release price of $10. It was planned to be released in 1966 but was cancelled. Ono stated that it would contain 150 new pieces not featured in Grapefruit, including her "touch poems".

In July 2013, Ono released Grapefruit's sequel, called Acorn, another book of "instructional poems".

== See also ==
- Instructions for Paintings (1961–62)
