= Acorn (book) =

2013 artist's book by Yoko Ono

- Author: Yoko Ono
- Language: English
- Genre: Artist's book
- Publisher: Algonquin Books
- Publication date: 2013
- ISBN: 978-1-939293-23-7
- Preceded by: Grapefruit

Acorn is an artist's book written by Yoko Ono published in 2013 by Algonquin Books as a follow-up to her Grapefruit book of conceptual art. It is ISBN 978-1-939293-23-7 (paperback), ISBN 978-1-939293-24-4 (ebook).

Yoko Ono's Dance Piece III page spread from Acorn

The book gathers together 100 brief thought experiments. Ono illustrates each proposal with pointillist "dot drawings".

== Background ==
Ono created the concept for the book in 1996, when she was experimenting with digital art. It was inspired by a 1969 Fluxus by Plastic Ono Band, a group Ono and John Lennon were members of, in which they had planted acorns at Coventry Cathedral for peace. Subsequently, they mailed other acorns to world leaders with a note: "Enclosed in this package we are sending you two living sculptures—which are acorns—in the hope that you will plant them in your garden and grow two oak-trees for world peace."
