= Instructions for Paintings =

1961–62 conceptual artwork by Yoko Ono

- 絵画の指示 (Japanese)
- Artist: Yoko Ono
- Year: 1961–1962
- Location: Museum of Modern Art, New York

Instructions for Paintings (aka 22 Instructions for Paintings) is a 1961–2 conceptual artwork of 22 instructions for paintings by Yoko Ono, handwritten in Japanese by her then-husband, the avant-garde composer Toshi Ichiyanagi. There were no associated paintings, just the instructions to create the paintings.

The works were originally shown in Tokyo on May 24, 1962, at the Sogetsu Art Center, as part of a concert and exhibition by Ono. Later, they were exhibited in New York. The works were exhibited in 1993 at Galeria 56 in Budapest, Hungary, and an associated book was published. They were included in the 2015 retrospective exhibition Yoko Ono: One Woman Show: 1960–1971 at the Museum of Modern Art in New York. In 2019, the works were transferred as part of the Gilbert and Lila Silverman Instruction Drawing Collection in Detroit to the collection of the Museum of Modern Art. and they were included in the retrospective exhibition Yoko Ono: One Woman Show: 1960–1971. They were also exhibited in the 2024 retrospective exhibition Yoko Ono: Music of the Mind at the Tate Modern gallery in London.

Instructions for artworks, musical compositions, and performances were also included in Ono's 1964 Grapefruit book, reissued in 2000. Instructions for Paintings has been described as "a watershed in the history of Conceptual art".
