= Michio Ihara =

Japanese kinetic sculptor

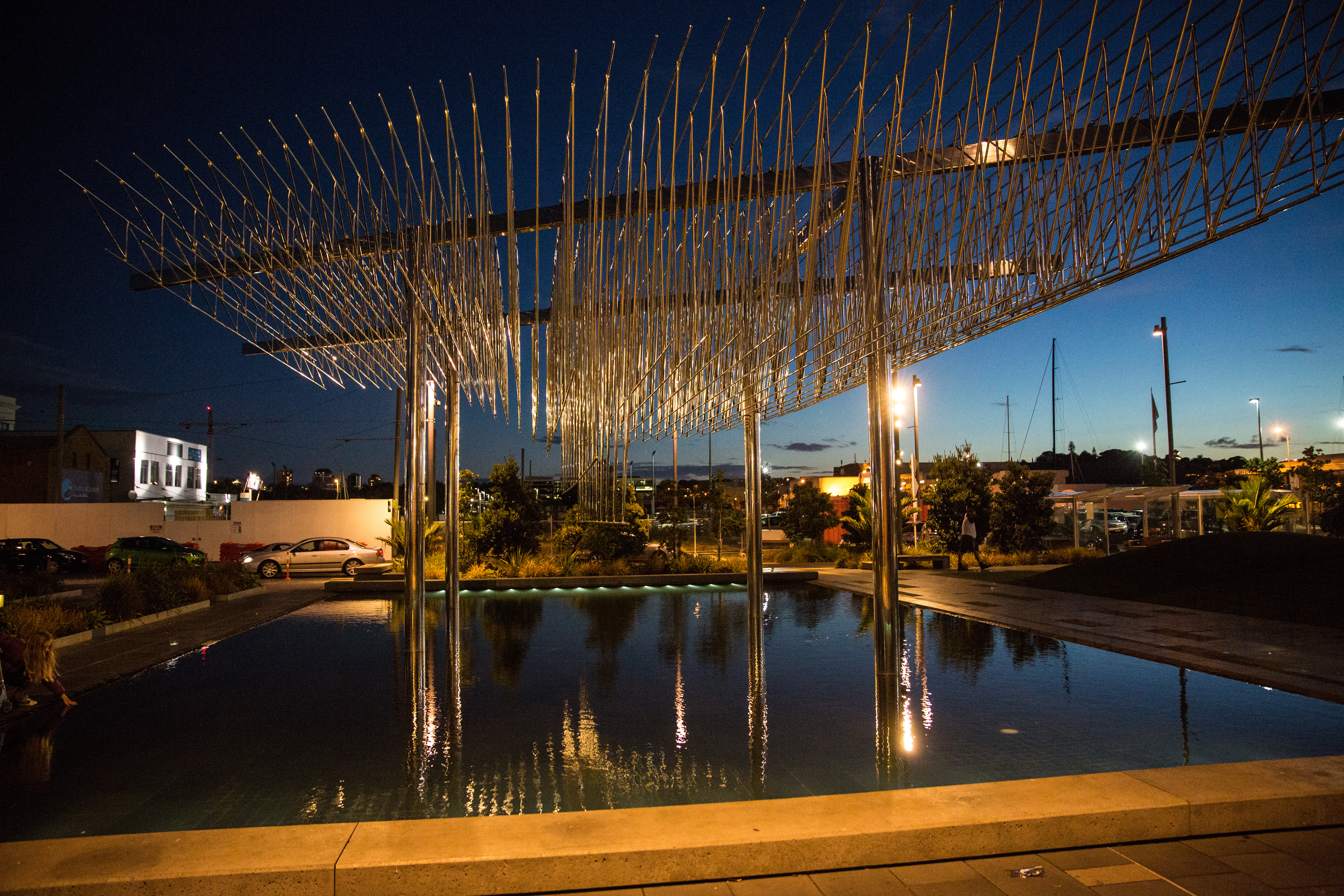
Wind Tree (1977), a sculpture in Wynyard Quarter, Auckland, New Zealand

Michio Ihara (born 1928, Paris) is a Japanese kinetic sculptor, educated in Japan who was influenced by the work of George Rickey. His works have been on display at the Rockefeller Center in New York and other international venues.
