= Kiyoshi Awazu =

Japanese graphic designer (1929–2009)

- Born: February 19, 1929; Meguro, Tokyo, Empire of Japan
- Died: April 28, 2009 (aged 80); Kawasaki, Kanagawa, Japan

Kiyoshi Awazu (Japanese: 粟津 潔, romanized: Awazu Kiyoshi, February 19, 1929 – April 28, 2009) was a Japanese graphic designer, active in the post-WWII era in the fields of poster design, architecture design, set design, filmmaking, and illustration. A self-taught artist, Awazu possessed an eclectic and variegated graphic style that employed vibrant color palettes, appropriated and subverted motifs from both traditional Japanese art and design as well as contemporary pop culture, and incorporated supergraphics and expressive typography across a range of scales and spatial contexts.

Believing that design was a basic function of human life, and that it was the social role of the designer "to extend the rural into the city, foreground the folklore, reawaken the past, summon back the outdated," Awazu worked with collaborators across genres and culled references from a vast array of sources to produce works that were intensely transdisciplinary and expressive, all while resisting the essentializing and universalizing tendencies of the modernist tradition. Beginning with his award-winning 1955 poster Umi o kaese [Give Back Our Oceans], an expression of solidarity with disenfranchised fishermen who were banned from conducting their activities by American Occupation forces, Awazu's work also displays a keen engagement with political activism and an emphasis on the capacity of visual communications to reveal injustices and expand awareness through affective means. Awazu worked with diverse collaborators across the fields of film, performance, and the visual arts to produce promotional posters, book designs, illustrations, and other graphic materials.

Awazu also worked with numerous modern architects—notably as a member of the Metabolism movement—to integrate structural design with other applied arts and foreground the role of design as a conduit for promoting civic engagement in urban contexts. Within the field of architecture, he is best known for producing the bold supergraphics on the exterior of the Nibankan building, which was famously featured on the cover of Charles Jencks' The Language of Modern Architecture (1977).

== Biography ==
=== Early life ===
Kiyoshi Awazu was born in 1929 in Himonya, Meguro ward. Awazu's father, an electrical lab technician in the Ministry of Communications, died in a train accident at the age of thirty, while the younger Awazu was still an infant. At the age of four, Awazu's mother remarried to a dressmaker and he was sent to live with his grandmother and uncle nearby. After graduating from elementary school, he attended a trade school at night while working different jobs, including at a rotary print press factory, a construction materials production company, and at a used book store in Kanda, where he began to delve deeply into poetry and literature.

Though Awazu entered the commerce department at Hosei University, classes were largely cancelled owing to the war, and his home was burned down in the bombing of Tokyo. After the surrender, Awazu dropped out of school and opted to become a subway employee at Meguro Station while becoming involved in a “Social Studies Study Group” near Hosei University, where he began to become involved in studies of Marxism-Leninism. In 1948, he quit his subway position and began working for the Japan Graphic Arts Association (Nihon sakuga kyōkai), a billboard and film pamphlet production agency while attending sketching classes at a small art studio in Ginza.

Awazu was a largely self-taught artist and credited his artistic education to reading numerous prewar art historical textbooks and journals and foreign graphic design magazines. During these studies, Awazu encountered the work of American artist Ben Shahn, best known for his social realist approach and expressive, graphic style, and Austrian-American graphic designer Herbert Bayer, who was trained at the Bauhaus and became a pioneering figure in modern typography. Shahn’s artistic engagements with political and social realities, as well as the lives of ordinary people, along with Bayer’s innovative use of photomontage and expressive handling of text as a graphic medium would serve as important influences on Awazu’s artistic development and his thinkings on the social role of design and visual communication in the modern world. Awazu's early works, which make use of strong, jagged lines, simplified forms, allegorical motifs, and focus on the expressive potentials of the human form bear strong traces of Shahn's artistic and political influences.

=== Umi o kaese and Career beginnings ===
From 1954 to 1958, Awazu worked in the publicity department at film production company Nikkatsu, creating silkscreened prints that primarily featured simple line drawings alongside hand-lettered titles. In 1954, Awazu joined the Independent Film Promotion Society, an interest group engaged in film poster design.

In 1955, after visiting Kujūkuri Beach in Chiba prefecture and witnessing the indignation of local fishermen in the area, who had been banned from conducting their activities by American Occupation forces, Awazu was inspired by their plight to create a protest poster entitled Umi o kaese [Give Back Our Oceans] in solidarity with their resistance efforts. The poster depicts a discontented fisherman, clad in a patchwork jacket against a cloudy beige background where the shadow of a single fishing boat appears in the distance. A silhouetted chain of barbed wire runs vertically down the subject's face, harshly cutting across the frame and flattening the ground of the image. The poster received the grand prize at the Nissenbi Exhibition organized by the Japan Advertising Artists' Club, bringing Awazu public recognition and catalyzing his graphic design career.

Awazu’s early drawings and paintings harken to the work of the Japanese Reportage artists and 19th-century French Realism painters, using muted earth tones and thick, painterly strokes to depict anonymized laborers and pedestrians against industrializing landscapes that also bore the presence of the American occupation. Awazu's melancholic scenes reflect his status as part of a generation of artists who witnessed and came of age in World War II and its aftermath, as well as his involvement in left-wing politics.

His style began to evolve and take on more experimental, abstract qualities during the 1960s. Resisting the formal conventions of mid-century modernism, Awazu instead opted for more expressive, variable forms that made use of sketches, ideograms, motifs culled from folklore and mythology, and adopted a vibrant pop color palette that would soon become synonymous with his style.

=== Poster design ===
From the late 1950s onward, Awazu began to gain widespread recognition through film and theater promotional posters, and in 1958 received the top prize at the International Film Poster Contest held in Paris. "Posters, as images created expressly for the dissemination of information, are by their very nature a strongly 'public' form of art," Awazu reflected in 1982.

Awazu possessed a rich language of motifs and styles that drew from a range of historical and popular references. Many of his works harken to the graphic linearity and expressive faces and textiles found in Japanese ukiyo-e woodblock printing, while subverting their contexts and colors to evoke contemporary pop sensibilities. Though best known for his psychedelic, symbol-laden assemblages that make use of vivid colors and crisp, expressive contours, Awazu was not restricted to a single style and often employed varied methods and techniques to create works that could be radically minimal in form, or used more painterly strokes and monochromatic palettes.

Understanding his practice as one of reprinting and reproducing in order to assert meanings and ideas, Awazu often made use of recurring motifs such as Sada Abe, turtles, and fingerprints in altered forms and famously proclaimed, "take the path of duplication!" as a rallying call for graphic design.

Many of Awazu's posters deal with political movements and social struggles, as evidenced by clients such as Shingeki theatre groups, the Japan Council against Atomic and Hydrogen Bombs, and causes such as the Korean struggle for democracy and anti-Vietnam War activism.

In 1984, Awazu was commissioned by the Japan Graphic Designers Association (JAGDA) to create the second poster for the annual Hiroshima Appeals series (launched the year prior by Yusaku Kamekura's Burning Butterflies design). Awazu's design, titled A Diversity of Birds, featured a densely packed canvas of seventeen birds of varying types, colors, and ages, rendered with textured strokes reminiscent of the quality of pastel crayons. Awazu sought to emphasize the birds' "human qualities" and represented them "with eyes wide open and mouths agape as if clamoring to communicate something," alluding to the collective spirit that fueled these calls for peace.

=== Filmmaking ===
Awazu was active in avant-garde filmmaking circles as both a poster designer and an occasional filmmaker. While at Nikkatsu, he created promotional posters to accompany the foreign distribution of films such as The Baby Carriage (1956), Children Who Draw (1956), and The Burmese Harp (1956). In contrast to the original domestic posters, which tended to feature photorealistic or photographic images of actors and were densely populated with text, Awazu's versions were far more austere and abstracted in nature, restrained in their chromatic variation, and rendered in a style reminiscent of abstract expressionist German woodcuts.

In 1961, Awazu designed the poster for Hiroshi Teshigahara's Pitfall (1962), which featured the fingerprint motif that would become one of the signature elements of Awazu's graphic vocabulary. He continued to work with Teshigahara on a number of occasions, designing the posters for the director's best-known work Woman in the Dunes (1964), and The Face of Another (1966). Awazu also produced a number of designs for Japanese releases of foreign films, including La Chinoise (1969) and Wind from the East (1970).

Awazu held a long-standing fascination with Antoni Gaudí, and traveled to Spain to create a film of the architect's work, which was completed in 1975. He also created a number of experimental films throughout his career and sat on the board of Film Art Inc. alongside Teshigahara and Kisho Kurokawa.

=== Illustration and book design ===
Awazu was a prolific book designer and illustrator, and by 1978 had produced designs for over 500 volumes. He referred to book design as the "origin of design," and the "god of all design." Through the medium of the book, Awazu exercised his desires to synthesize text and image and communicate information to the masses using design as the vehicle. He was also commissioned to produce regular magazine covers for publications across genres, including Contemporary Architecture (Kindai kenchiku), Asahi Broadcasting Corporation (Hо̄sо̄ asahi), The Documentary Film (Kiroku eizо̄), Art Quarterly (Kikan geijutsu), and World of Automobiles (Jidо̄sha to sono sekai).

Awazu also worked with Kо̄hei Sugiura to design Hiroshima-Nagasaki Document 61 (1962), a photobook of works by Ken Domon and Shо̄mei Tо̄matsu. In 1970, Awazu published a manga titled Sutetaro, set in the early Showa era and centered around a boy abandoned at birth, that dealt with themes of birth and death through a dreamlike, folkloric narrative. Rendered in austere, almost childlike linear drawings and paired with sparse, poetic fragments of dialogue, the comic reveals the breadth of Awazu's conceptual practice and his preoccupation was fundamental questions regarding humanity and the expressive capacities of line and text across narrative formats.

Though the vast majority of Awazu's illustrated publications were not intended for children, especially given his frequent inclusion of sexual themes, political topics, and garish colors, the designer did work on seven children's books over the course of his career. The first of these publications, Remi is Alive (Remi wa ikiteiru), an autobiographical children's book written by Imao Hirano about the author's struggles growing up as the son of an American father and Japanese mother, was published in 1958. On the topic of children's books, Awazu reflected in 1973: "I had for long hoped to make a children’s book with my own works when I reached old age. This is related to how I often used to tell imaginary stories I’d made up to my children when they were little, but also because I came to sense a certain fairy-tale like element within the style of all my works...I rarely attempted to draw illustrations for children’s books since I had looked at most children’s books in circulation as a certain betrayal on part of adults. That being said, if there is any fairy-tale like element in my style of work at all, I hope to embrace it as much as possible."

=== Involvement in architecture ===
During the 1960s and 1970s in Japan, interest in the notion of "environmental art" (kankyо̄ bijutsu) as a conceptual framework for dissolving the boundaries between applied and fine arts, and dynamically integrating disciplines such as painting, sculpture, architecture, design, photography, music, and performance. These ideas were made manifest through group exhibitions such as From Space to Environment in 1966, as well as collaborative design projects. Awazu too was deeply engaged with interdisciplinary projects throughout his career, and was particularly involved with the Metabolism group during the late 1950s and 1960s, who put forth theories of urban growth through the prism of biological metaphors.

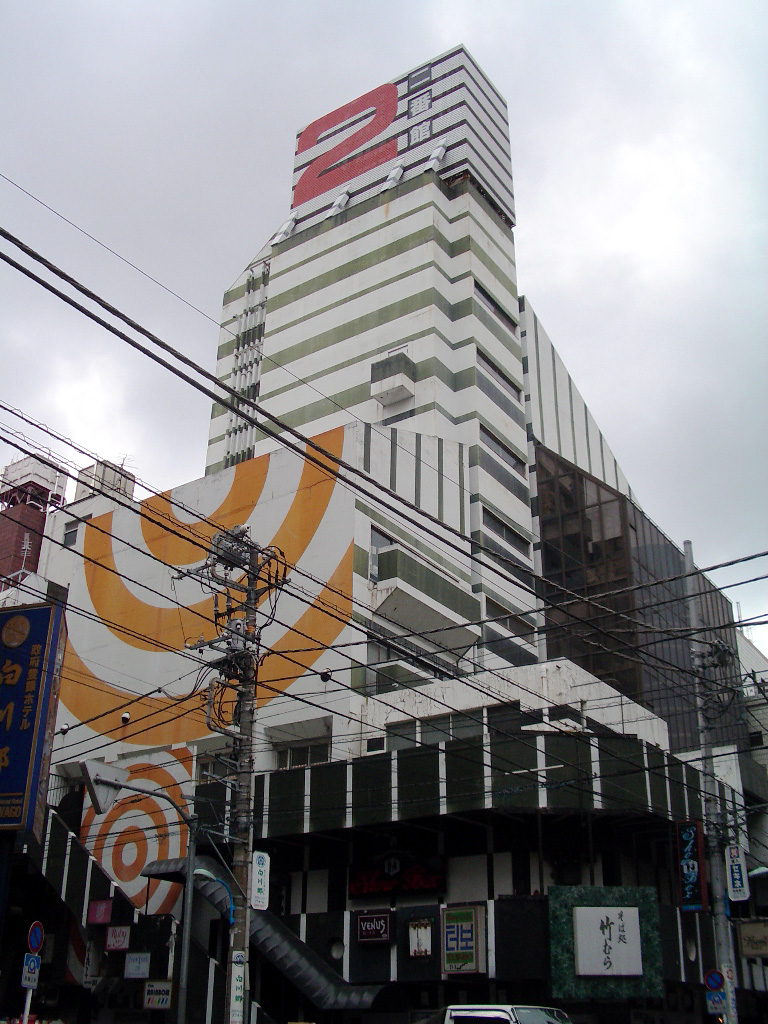
Nibankan, Kabukichō, Tokyo. Architectural design by Minoru Takeyama, exterior graphics by Kiyoshi Awazu.

Awazu designed key elements of the group's graphic identity, such as the logo and opening pages for each chapter of the group's manifesto booklet METABOLISM 1960, and also designed books by several of the members, including Kawazoe Noboru’s Contemporary Japanese Architecture (1973) and Kisho Kurokawa's The Work of Kisho Kurokawa: Capsule, Spaceframe, Metabolism, Metamorphose (1970), which featured vibrant assemblages of the architect's structural innovations, surrealist motifs, and expressive typography to illustrate the dynamism of the architect's multimodal vision and imagination. Awazu's logo for the Metabolism movement was a riff on a three-pronged tomoe, a traditional Japanese motif with comma-like swirls. The scale of the three elements was subtly altered such that they each differed in size (a departure from the traditional composition which features equally-sized elements), suggesting gradual growth rather than endless circularity to echo the ambitions of the architectural collective.

Though the Metabolist architects were chiefly concerned with the biomimetic dimensions of urban growth and economic development, Awazu acknowledged that his views on the city differed slightly from his colleagues, citing a greater interest in the "more indigenous and ethnic rather than metabolistic" experiences of modern human life. This orientation has parallels in the turn towards "primitivism" initiated by Taro Okamoto's praise of Jomon pottery, and is revealed in Awazu's use of folkloric imagery and symbolic motifs. While his multimodal, densely layered designs for works like the poster design for The Works of Kisho Kurokawa (an exhibit of Kurokawa's work held at Expo '70) allude to the unyielding flows of information and the cybernetic thinking that undergirded the Metabolists' philosophy, Shirley Surya notes that the chaotic overlap of graphics, the "organic and unruly" patterns, repeating phrases, and inclusion of seemingly unrelated icons (like a rooster, stopwatch, and snake) amidst the diagram of Kurokawa's trussed system are indiciative of Awazu's alternative approach to understanding biological growth through languages of transformation, vibrancy, and experimentation.

Awazu was also active as an spatial designer, and created the venue for the exhibition “The Future: World of Progress," located within the central "Symbol Zone" of Expo '70 in Osaka, as well as an immersive, multi-projection work entitled Mandara-rama that was installed in the presentation space.

In addition to collaborating with architects on the dissemination of their print materials, Awazu frequently created worked with architects to produce interior and exterior design elements that sought to expand the boundaries of architectural participation with the fabric of the city, and use design as a means of drafting new relationships between people and spaces. In 1970, he collaborated with architect Minoru Takeyama to produce a set of brightly colored supergraphics and geometric patterns that covered the entire exterior of the Nibankan Building in Kabukicho. Created using inexpensive paints, the concept for the design was to have the murals replaced every five years with a new set of patterns, harkening to the endlessly mutating, anti-historical quality of the red light district. The building was famously featured on the cover of Charles Jencks' 1977 publication The Language of Post-Modern Architecture.

=== Other professional activities ===
Awazu taught at a number of institutions throughout his career, including Kuwasawa Design School and Musashino University. In 1968, he became the editor in chief of Dezain hihyо̄, and in 2000 he was appointed the first director of the Printing Museum, Tokyo. Awazu was also a prolific writer and theorist of graphic design, and published widely on topics regarding the social role and functions of design, the relationships between design and allied disciplines, as well as personal reflections on his design education and influences. Notable publications include What Can Design Do (Dezain ni nani ga dekiru ka) (1969) and A Song in Praise of Gaudi (Gaudi Sanka) (1981), an extensive study of the work of Catalan architect Antoni Gaudí.

== Legacy ==
In 1955, Awazu married Yaeko Shibuya, a fellow member of the Independent Film Promotion Society.

Awazu suffered from Alzheimer's disease and died of pneumonia in 2009 at the age of 80.

In 2007, the Awazu Design Studio donated 2,932 artworks and archival materials to the 21st Century Museum of Contemporary Art, Kanazawa and shortly after the museum organized Graphism in the Wilderness, a major exhibition featuring 1,750 of the donated works. From 2014 to 2018, the museum organized a five-part series of exhibitions dedicated to various dimensions of Awazu's practice, including his involvement in architecture, performance, and photography. Many of his film posters, including early silk prints of Nikkatsu films from the 1950s, are in the collection of the National Film Centre of the National Museum of Modern Art, Tokyo. Volumes from his personal library are preserved at the Museums on Echigo-Tsumari (MonET) as part of the Awazu Kiyoshi Library collection. Other notable collections are found at the Kawasaki City Museum (which Awazu was involved in founding), the Cuban Council of Fine Arts, the Museum of Modern Art, and the Los Angeles County Museum of Art.

In 2023, Awazu's studio in Kawasaki, designed in 1972 by architect Hiroshi Hara, was renovated and opened to the public as an exhibition space aimed at highlighting the work of up-and-coming artists.
