= Sōgetsu-ryū =

School of ikebana

Sōgetsu-ryū (草月流) is a school of ikebana, or Japanese floral art.

== History ==
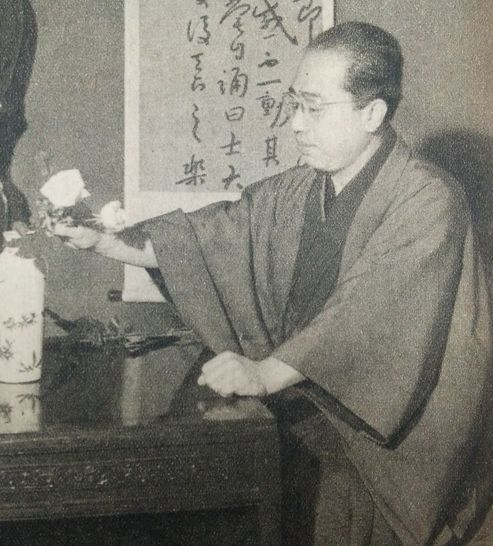
The founder Sōfū Teshigahara in 1948

Sōgetsu was founded by Sōfū Teshigahara in 1927. Sōfū's father was an ikebana master, who taught his son from childhood. Sōfū wanted to become a painter, but he found that the possibilities for creative expression in using green materials are endless, just as in painting.

He found that the strict rules of traditional ikebana did not allow individual expression. He broke away from traditional ikebana and formed his school in 1926. In the beginning, he promoted the school through radio.

As of 2016, there have been four headmasters. Sōfū's daughter Kasumi was a gifted artist. She became the second headmaster until she died at age 47. Her elder brother, film director Hiroshi Teshigahara, took over. The current headmaster is Akane, Sōfū's granddaughter.

The Sōgetsu school is an open-minded and avant-gardist school. The school was one of the first to have English textbooks.

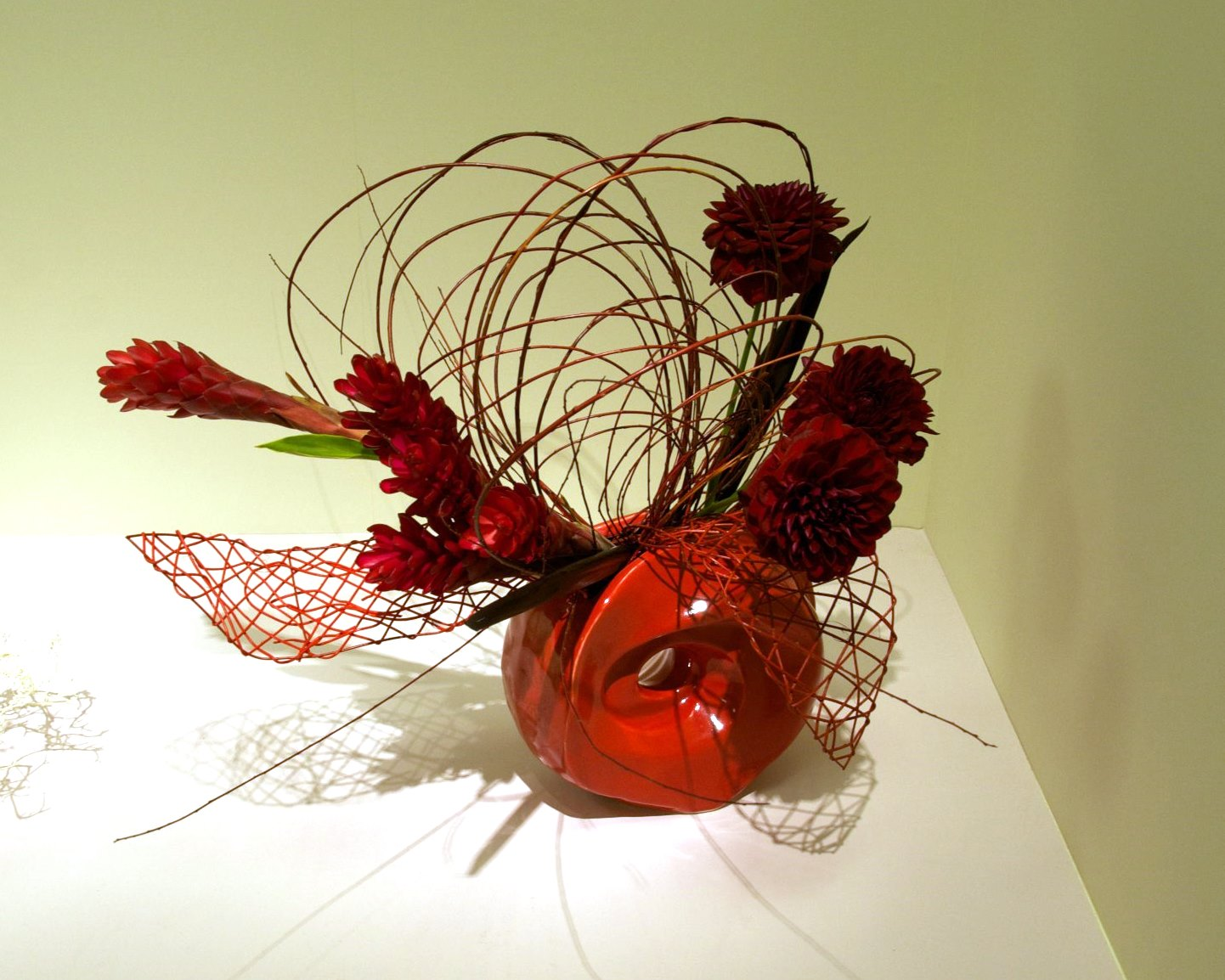
Free-style arrangement

A famous saying by Sōfū Teshigahara and credo of the Sōgetsu school is that Sōgetsu can be done by anyone, anywhere, anytime with any kind of material.

The school is led by Akane Teshigahara, the founder's granddaughter. Noted practitioners include Master Instructor Kōka Fukushima, whose masterclasses worldwide have received acclaim in floral art circles.

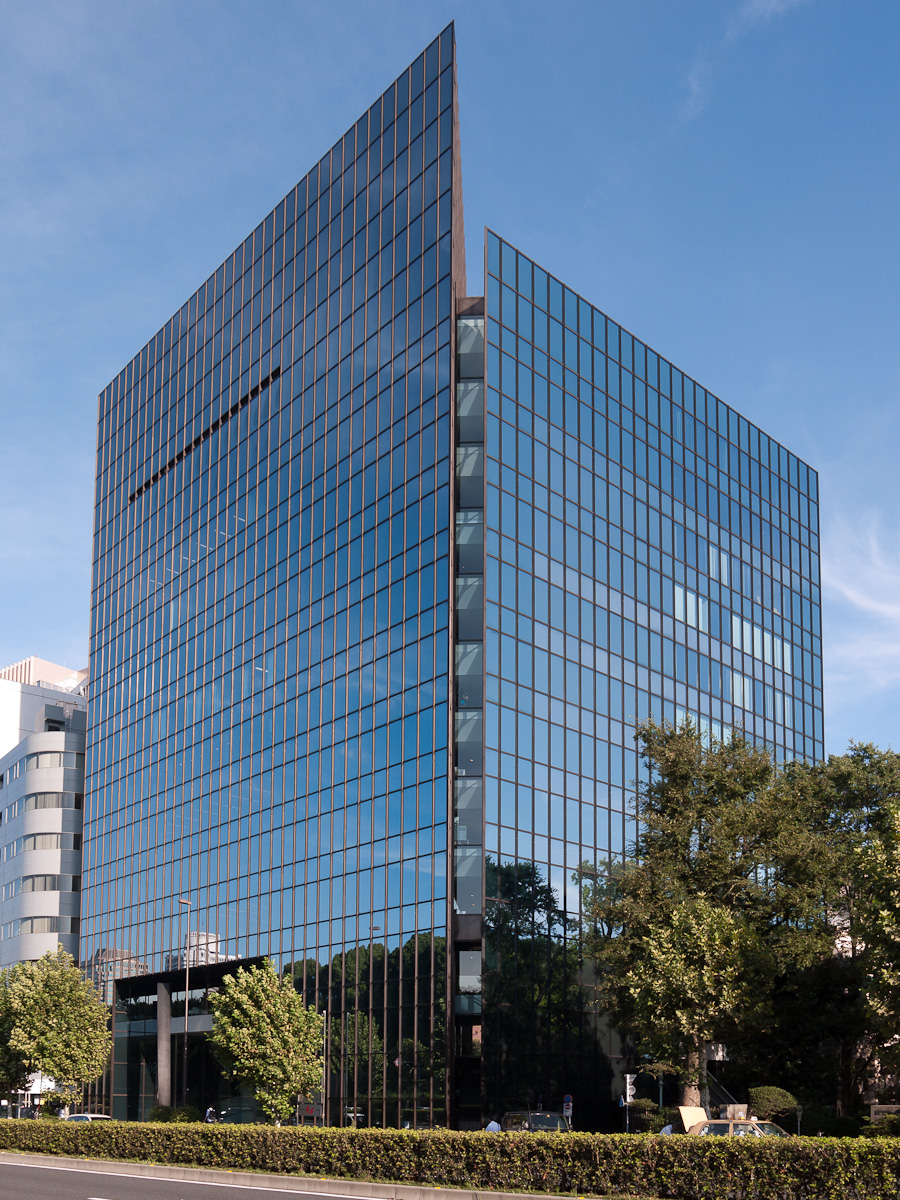
Sōgetsu Hall headquarters in Tokyo

The headquarters was constructed by the architect Kenzo Tange.

Beverly Harden, the mother of the actress Marcia Gay Harden, was a practitioner of the Sōgetsu school. She later became also president of the Ikebana International Washington, DC chapter.

== Styles ==
Sōgetsu typically uses either a tall, narrow vase such as one made from a bamboo stem, or a flat, open dish called a "suiban" in which the flowers and branches are fixed in a hidden spiked kenzan. However, other forms are possible, including highly elaborate creations that fill an entire hall. The arrangements in a tall vase are called Nageire, the ones in a shallow container are called Moribana.

One of Sōgetsu's central ideas is that an arrangement should have three strong elements, each with certain proportions and arranged at a certain angle. But there is considerable latitude to work with whatever materials are available and to express the spirit of the moment.

== Headmasters ==
- 1st Teshigahara Sōfū ( 勅使河原蒼風), 1900–1979
- 2nd Teshigahara Kasumi (勅使河原霞), 1932–1980
- 3rd Teshigahara Hiroshi (勅使河原宏), 1927–2001
- 4th Teshigahara Akane (勅使河原茜) b. 1960
