= Sōfū Teshigahara =

Founder of the Sogetsu-ryū school of ikebana

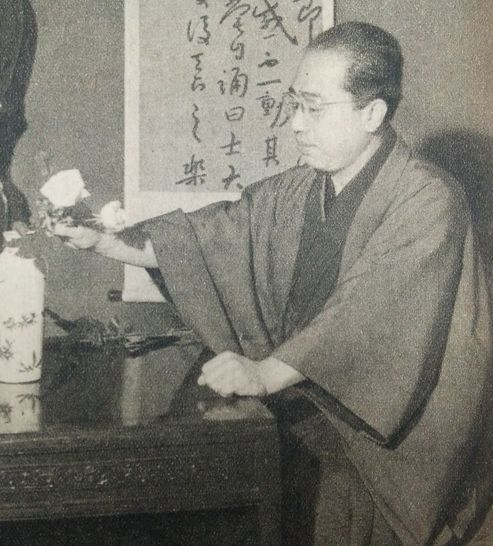
Sōfū Teshigahara in 1948

Sōfū Teshigahara (勅使河原 蒼風 Teshigahara Sōfū, 17 December 1900 – 5 September 1979) was the founder of the Sōgetsu-ryū school of ikebana flower arranging.

== Biography ==
He was born in Tokyo. He learned flower arranging from his father, who had studied many styles of different schools. In 1927 he started the Sōgetsu School. His son is the Japanese film director Hiroshi Teshigahara. His daughter-in-law is the actress Toshiko Kobayashi.

He believed that ikebana is an art and that the difference between the Sōgetsu School and Ikebana lies in the belief that once all the rules are learned and the techniques mastered, an unbounded field remains for freer personal expression using varied materials, not just flowers.

In 1929 he held the first Sogetsu exhibition at Ginza, in 1930 at the Josui Kaikan in Tokyo working with scrap metal, a new medium. In 1949 the first major post-war Sōgetsu exhibition was held at the Mitsukoshi Department Store in Ginza and proved to be revolutionary. Between 1950 and 1970, he held exhibitions and demonstrations across Europe and the United States.

Sōfū never deviated from the basic principles that distinguish ikebana from other forms of floral art: to grasp and express the feeling of the material, to express the third dimension and asymmetrical balance. The concept that was foremost in his teaching was that the principles never change, but rather that the form is always changing. His further belief was that ikebana should be considered art, not merely decoration and that it is for the entire world, not just Japan alone. In addition to ikebana, he continued to create various sculptures, drawings and works of calligraphy until his death.

== Recognition ==
The French government awarded him the Order of Arts and Letters in 1960, and the Legion of Honor in 1961. Japan bestowed the Minister of Education Awards for Art in 1962. Sofu was awarded the 59th Carnegie Prize by the Carnegie Museum of Art in 2026 for outstanding achievement in his lifetime of work. He is the first artist to receive this award posthumously.
